= List of companies of Indonesia =

Location of Indonesia

Indonesia is a unitary sovereign state and transcontinental country located mainly in Southeast Asia with some territories in Oceania. Indonesia's economy is the world's 16th largest by nominal GDP and the 8th largest by GDP at PPP, the largest in Southeast Asia, and is considered an emerging market and newly industrialised country. Indonesia has been a member of the United Nations since 1950. Indonesia was an organizer of the Bandung Conference and was the founder of Non-Aligned Movement; and also the founding member of Association of Southeast Asian Nations, Asia-Pacific Economic Cooperation, East Asia Summit, and Organisation of Islamic Cooperation. Indonesia is a member of the G20 major economies, OPEC, and World Trade Organization.

For further information on the types of business entities in this country and their abbreviations, see "Business entities in Indonesia".

== Largest firms ==
This list shows firms in the Fortune Global 500, which ranks firms by total revenues reported before 3 August 2022. Only the top five firms (if available) are included as a sample.

Rank	Image	Name	2021 Revenues (US$M)	Employees	Notes
223		Pertamina	57,510	34,183	State-owned oil and natural gas company based in Jakarta. The firm entered the list at #122 in 2013, but sustained declines in revenues moved it down more than 100 positions on the list by 2016.

== Notable firms ==
This list includes notable companies with primary headquarters located in the country. The industry and sector follow the Industry Classification Benchmark taxonomy. Organizations which have ceased operations are included and noted as defunct.

Notable companies Status: P=Private, S=State; A=Active, D=Defunct
Name	Industry	Sector	Headquarters	Founded	Notes	Status	
Asuransi Jasindo	Financials	Full line insurance	Jakarta	1973	Insurance	S	A
Alumindo	Industrials	Aluminium	Surabaya	1978	Aluminium foil	P	A
Angkasa Pura	Consumer services	Transportation services	Jakarta	1962	State-owned airports	S	A
Astra International	Conglomerates	-	Jakarta	1957	Automotive, financials, industrials, technology	P	A
Badak LNG	Industrials	Gas refineries	Bontang	1974	State-owned natural gas refineries	S	A
Bank Central Asia	Financials	Banks	Jakarta	1957	Bank	P	A
Bank Tabungan Negara	Financials	Banks	Jakarta	1950	Bank	S	A
Bank Mandiri	Financials	Banks	Jakarta	1998	Bank	S	A
Bank Negara Indonesia	Financials	Banks	Jakarta	1946	Bank	S	A
Bank Rakyat Indonesia	Financials	Banks	Jakarta	1895	Bank	S	A
Bentoel Group	Consumer goods	Tobacco	Malang	1930	Tobacco	P	A
Bio Farma	Health care	Pharmaceuticals	Bandung	1890	Vaccine	S	A
Bumi Resources	Basic materials	General mining	Jakarta	1973	Mining	P	A
Djarum	Consumer goods	Tobacco	Kudus and Jakarta	1951	Tobacco	P	A
Dragon Computer & Communication	Technology	Computer hardware	Jakarta	1980	Computer hardware	P	A
Elex Media Komputindo	Consumer services	Publishing	Jakarta	1985	Publisher	P	A
Garuda Indonesia	Consumer services	Travel & leisure	Tangerang	1949	State-owned airline	S	A
Greenfields	Consumer goods	Dairy products	Malang	1997	Milk and other dairy products	P	A
Gudang Garam	Consumer goods	Tobacco	Kediri	1958	Tobacco	P	A
Indocement	Industrials	Building materials & fixtures	Jakarta	1985	Cement, part of HeidelbergCement (Germany)	P	A
Indofood	Consumer goods	Food products	Jakarta	1968	Food production	P	A
Indonesia Port Corporation	Industrials	Marine transportation	Jakarta	1992	State owned corporation	S	A
Indonesian Aerospace	Industrials	Aerospace	Bandung	1976	State-owned aircraft design	S	A
Indosat	Telecommunications	Fixed line telecommunications	Jakarta	1967	Telecommunications network	P	A
Industri Kereta Api	Industrials	Locomotive and railways	Madiun	1981	Locomotive and railway manufacturers	S	A
Jalur Nugraha Ekakurir	Industrials	Delivery services	Jakarta	1990	Express logistics	P	A
Java Integrated Industrial and Port Estate	Industrials	Ports and real estates	Gresik	2015	Ports and real estates	P	A
Jawa Pos Group	Consumer services	Media agencies	Surabaya	1949	Media holding	P	A
Kalbe Farma	Health care	Pharmaceuticals	Jakarta	1966	Pharmaceuticals	P	A
Kedawung Setia Industrial	Industrials	Home appliance	Surabaya	1973	Home appliance	P	A
Kereta Api Indonesia	Industrials	Railroads	Bandung	1945	State-owned railway	S	A
Kimia Farma	Health care	Pharmaceuticals	Jakarta	1971	State-owned pharma	S	A
Kino Indonesia	Consumer goods	Food products and personal care	Tangerang	1999	Foods, beverages and beauty products	P	A
Kompas Gramedia Group	Consumer services	Media agencies	Jakarta	1965	Media holding	P	A
Krakatau Steel	Basic materials	Iron & steel	Cilegon	1970	State-owned steel	S	A
Lion Air	Consumer services	Airlines	Jakarta	2000	Low-cost airline	P	A
Lippo Group	Financials	Real estate holding & development	Jakarta	1950	Development	P	A
Maspion	Industrials	Electronics	Surabaya	1962	Home electronics and home appliance	P	A
Matahari	Consumer services	Broadline retailers	Tangerang	1982	Department stores	P	A
Mayora Indah	Consumer goods	Food products	Jakarta	1977	Foods and beverages	P	A
MedcoEnergi	Oil & gas	Exploration & production	Jakarta	1980	Energy, oil and gas	P	A
Media Nusantara Citra	Consumer services	Broadcasting & entertainment	Jakarta	1997	Media	P	A
Pabrik Kertas Indonesia	Industrials	Paper industry	Surabaya	1977	Pulp and paper industry	P	A
Pakuwon Jati	Real estate	Real estate development	Surabaya	1982	Real estate development and Shopping malls	P	A
Panin Sekuritas	Financials	Investment services	Jakarta	1989	Broker	P	A
PAL Indonesia	Industrials	Shipbuilders	Surabaya	1939	State-owned shipbuilding design	S	A
Pegadaian	Financials	Consumer finance	Jakarta	1901	State-owned financial services	S	A
Pelni	Industrials	Marine transportation	Jakarta	1952	Shipping	S	A
Polygon Bikes	Industrials	Bicycles	Sidoarjo	1989	Bicycle manufacturing	P	A
Pos Indonesia	Industrials	Delivery services	Bandung	1995	State-owned postal service	S	A
Pertamina	Oil & gas	Integrated oil & gas	Jakarta	1957	State-owned oil and natural gas	S	A
Pertamina Gas Negara	Utilities	Gas distribution	Jakarta	1965	State-owned natural gas transportation	S	A
Perusahaan Listrik Negara	Utilities	Conventional electricity	Jakarta	1945	State-owned electrical distribution	S	A
Petrokimia Gresik	Industrials	Fertilizer and chemicals	Gresik	1972	State-owned fertilizer and chemical producers	S	A
Phillip Securities Indonesia	Financials	Investment services	Jakarta	1989	Financial services	P	A
Pindad	Industrials	Defense	Bandung	1808	State-owned defense	S	A
Metro Supermarket	Consumer services	Food retailers & wholesalers	Jakarta	1955	Supermarkets	P	A
Pupuk Kalimantan Timur	Industrials	Fertilizer and chemicals	Bontang	1977	State-owned fertilizer and chemical producers	S	A
Salim Group	Conglomerates	-	Jakarta	1972	Industrials, financials, consumer goods	P	A
Sampoerna	Consumer goods	Tobacco	Surabaya	1913	Tobacco	P	A
Sat Nusapersada	Industrials	Electronic & Electrical Equipment	Batam	1990		P	A
Semen Indonesia	Industrials	Building materials & fixtures	Gresik	1957	Cement	S	A
Siantar Top	Consumer goods	Food products	Sidoarjo	1972	Snack products	P	A
Sido Muncul	Consumer goods	Pharmaceutical	Semarang	1940	Supplements	P	A
Sinar Mas	Industrials	Conglomerate	Jakarta	1938	Pulp and paper industry	P	A
Suparma	Industrials	Paper industry	Surabaya	1976	Pulp and paper industry	P	A
Susi Air	Consumer services	Airlines	Pangandaran	2004	Charter airline	P	A
Telkom Indonesia	Telecommunications	Fixed line telecommunications	Bandung	1856	Telecommunication services	S	A
Televisi Republik Indonesia	Television Network	Broadcasting & entertainment	Jakarta	1962	Media	S	A
Trans Corp	Conglomerates	-	Jakarta	2006	Media, consumer services, real estate, part of CT Corp	P	A
United Tractors	Industrials	Commercial vehicles & trucks	Jakarta	1972	Heavy equipment	P	A
Waskita	Industrials	Heavy construction	Jakarta	1961	State-owned construction	S	A
Wings	Consumer goods	Food products and cleaners	Surabaya	1948	Food products, cleaners, and soap producer	P	A
Wismilak Group	Consumer goods	Tobacco	Surabaya	1962	Tobacco	P	A

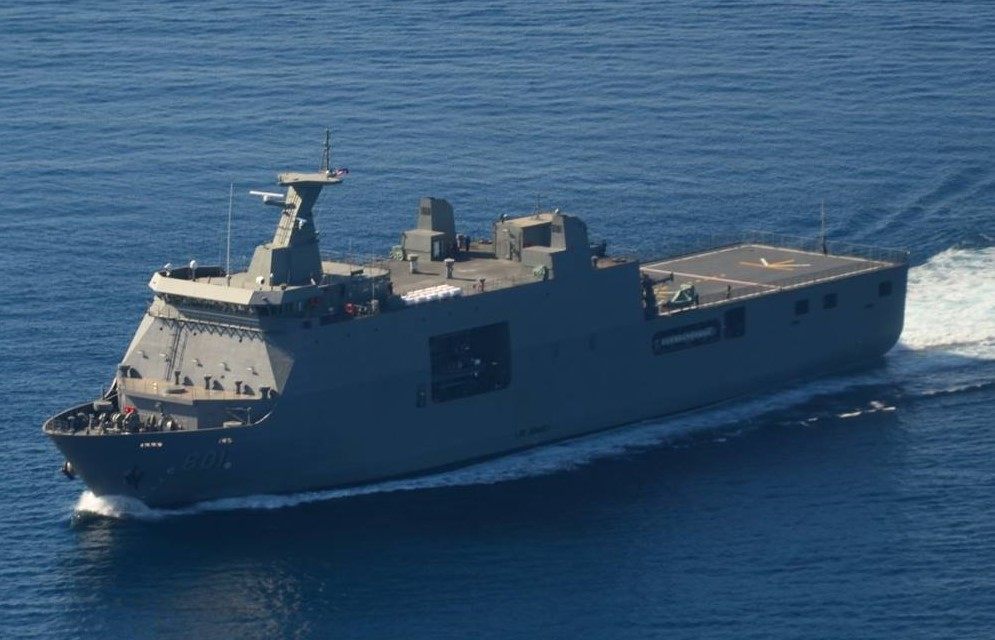
Tarlac-class landing platform dock ships built by Penataran Angkatan Laut.

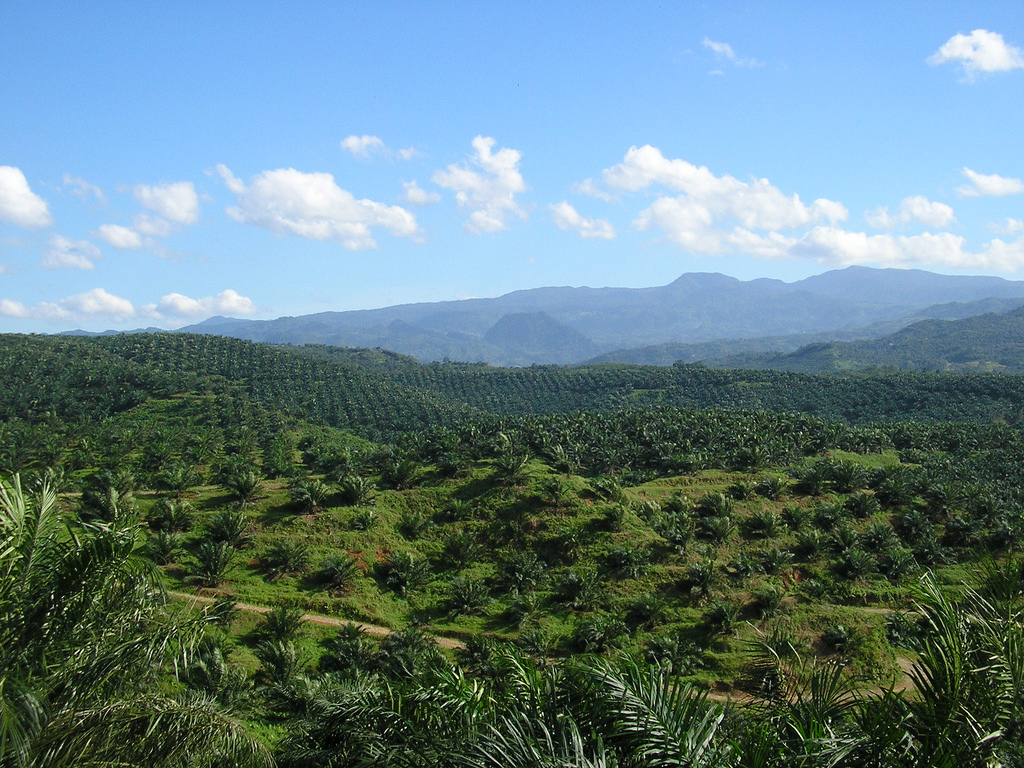
Palm oil plantations in Indonesia.

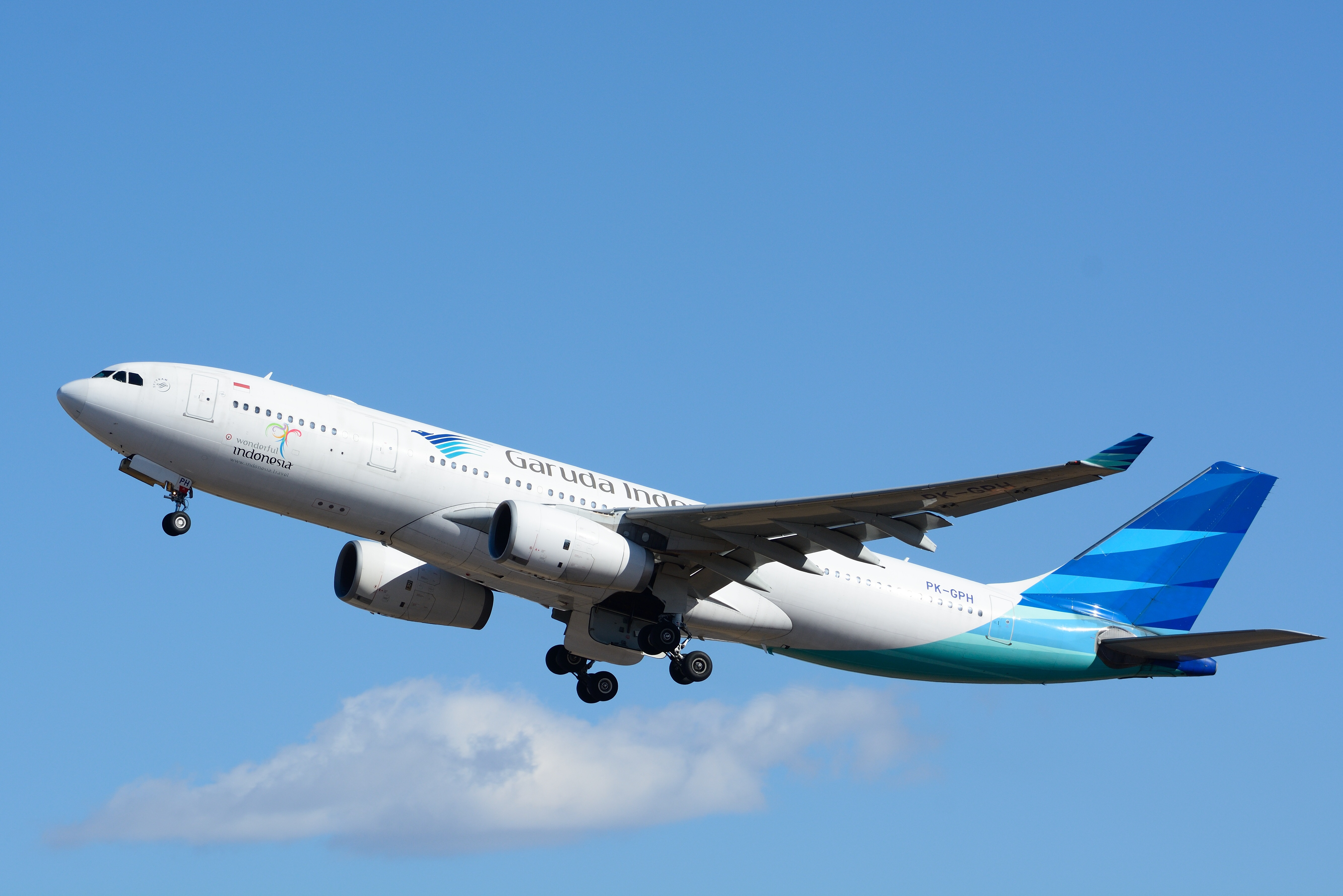
Garuda Indonesia jet.

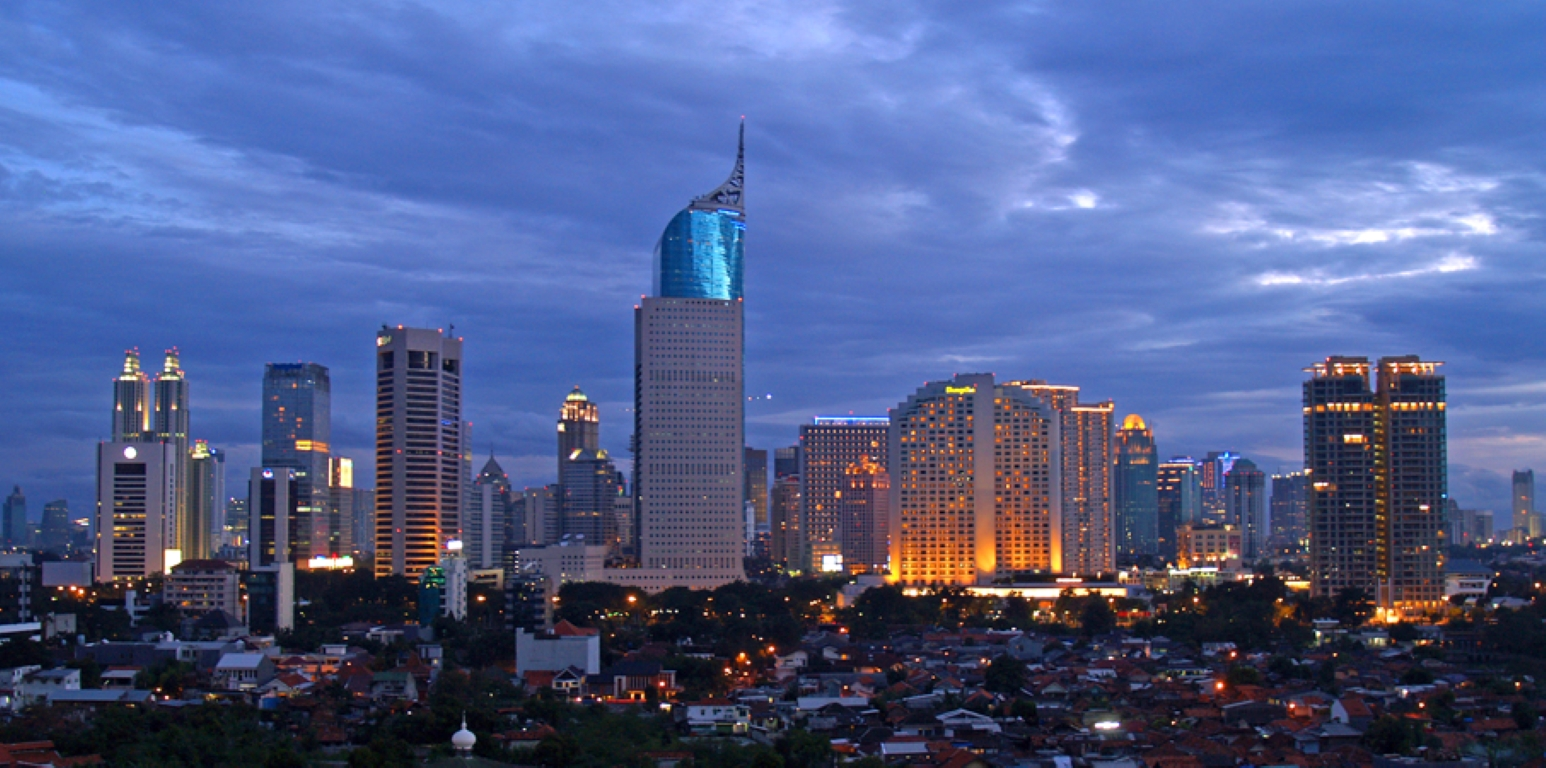
Golden Triangle of Jakarta (including the SCBD), a financial and economic hub.

== See also ==
- Economy of Indonesia
