= Waru–Juanda Toll Road =

Toll road in East Java

Waru-Juanda Toll Road

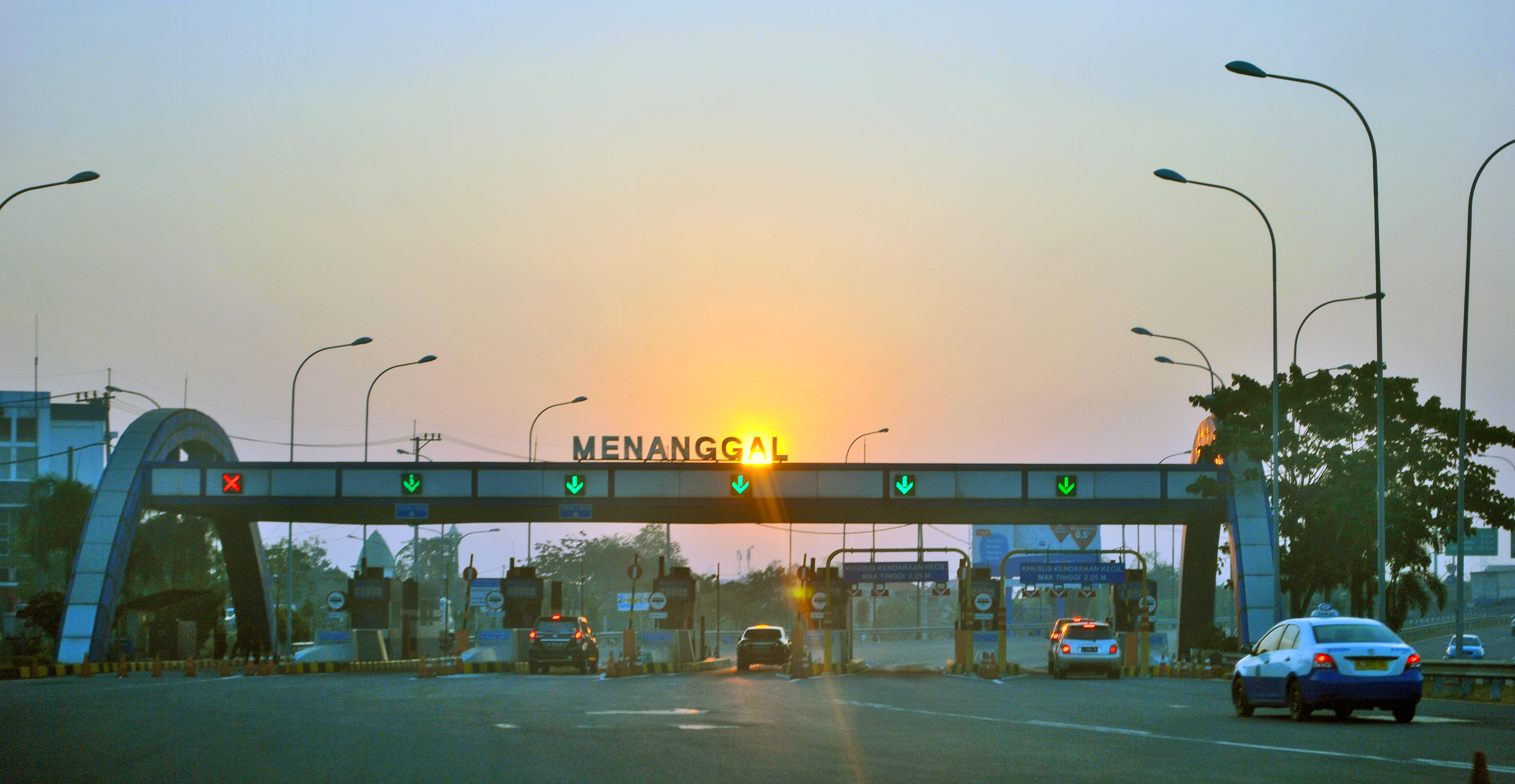
- Waru–Juanda Toll Road at Menanggal Toll Gate in 2015

Route information
- Part of AH2
- Maintained by PT Citra Margatama Surabaya
- Length: 12.8 km (8.0 mi)
- Existed: 2008–present

Major junctions
- West end: Waru
- AH2 – Surabaya–Gempol Toll Road; AH2 – Surabaya–Mojokerto Toll Road
- East end: Juanda International Airport

Location
- Country: Indonesia
- Provinces: East Java
- Major cities: Sidoarjo Regency; Surabaya

Highway system
- Transport in Indonesia

Waru-Juanda Toll Road is a 12.8 kilometers (8.0 mi) controlled-access toll road connecting Bundaran Waru, Sidoarjo, south of Surabaya to Juanda International Airport in Indonesia. This toll road crosses the area of Surabaya and Sidoarjo. The toll road is connected to the Surabaya–Mojokerto Toll Road and Surabaya–Gempol Toll Road in the east. This highway is complementary to the Trans-Java Toll Road. The toll road was inaugurated by President Susilo Bambang Yudhoyono in 2008 and operated by PT Citra Margatama Surabaya, a subsidiary of PT Citra Marga Nusaphala Persada.

== Toll gates ==
Province	Location	km	mi	Exit	Name	Destinations	Notes
East Java	Taman, Sidoarjo Regency	0	0.0	Surabaya–Mojokerto Toll Road			
East Java	Waru, Sidoarjo Regency	0	0.0	0 (760)	Waru Interchange	Surabaya–Gempol Toll Road; Southbound; Sidoarjo; Gempol; Gempol–Pandaan Toll Road; Northbound; Gunung Sari; Kota Satelit; Surabaya–Gresik Toll Road	Northwestern terminus
East Java	Gayungan, Surabaya	1	0.62	Menanggal Toll Gate (For Southeast-bound only)			
East Java	Waru, Sidoarjo Regency	2.9	1.8	3 (763)	Berbek Toll Gate	Rungkut; Berbek	
East Java	Waru, Sidoarjo Regency	5.8	3.6	6 (766)	Tambak Sumur Toll Gate	Tambak Sumur; Kenjeran; Suramadu Bridge	
East Java	Waru, Sidoarjo Regency	9.6	6.0	Juanda Toll Gate (For Northwest-bound only)			
East Java	Sedati, Sidoarjo Regency	12	7.5	Juanda International Airport			
1.000 mi = 1.609 km; 1.000 km = 0.621 mi: Electronic toll collection; Incomplete access; Route transition
