= Sidoarjo Regency Regional House of Representatives =

Sidoarjo Regency Regional House of Representatives Dewan Perwakilan Rakyat Daerah Kabupaten Sidoarjo
- 2024–2029 period

Type
- Type: Unicameral
- Term limits: 5 years

History
- New session started: 21 August 2024

Leadership
- Speaker: Abdillah Nasih, PKB since 30 September 2024
- Deputy Speaker: Suyarno, PDI-P since 3 October 2024
- Deputy Speaker: Kayan, Gerindra since 30 September 2024
- Deputy Speaker: Warih Andono, Golkar since 30 September 2024

Structure
- Seats: 30
- Political groups: PDI-P (9) NasDem (2) PKB (15) Democratic (2) PAN (4) Golkar (5) PPP (1) Gerindra (9) PKS (3)

Elections
- Voting system: Open list
- Last election: 14 February 2024

Meeting place
- Sidoarjo Regency Regional House of Representatives Building; Sultan Agung Street; Magersari, Sidoarjo, Sidoarjo Regency; East Java, Indonesia

The Sidoarjo Regency Regional House of Representatives is the unicameral municipal legislature of Sidoarjo Regency, East Java, Indonesia. It has 50 members, who are elected every five years, simultaneously with the national legislative election.

== Legal basis ==
The legislature for Sidoarjo Regency was formed along with those of other regencies in East Java under Law Number 12 of 1950, which organized regency governments within the province.

== General election results ==
=== 2024 Indonesian legislative election ===
The official valid votes received by political parties contesting the 2024 Indonesian legislative election in each electoral district (constituency) for members of the Sidoarjo Regency Regional House of Representatives are as follows.

2024 Indonesian legislative election results

Electoral district	PKB	Gerindra	PDI-P	Golkar	NasDem	Labour	Gelora	PKS	PKN	Hanura	Garuda	PAN	PBB	Democratic	PSI	Perindo	PPP	Ummat	Valid votes
Sidoarjo 1	61,705	27,572	25,596	21,725	25,320	1,695	854	12,099	291	994	0	16,002	613	13,269	8,518	1,787	1,712	2,559	222,311
Sidoarjo 2	53,032	42,477	29,261	14,249	10,404	1,038	852	8,721	443	233	0	21,019	296	16,274	3,107	983	9,129	1,227	212,745
Sidoarjo 3	63,874	34,595	52,229	11,321	2,579	1,476	2,232	9,341	79	407	0	4,626	171	8,810	2,043	545	906	498	195,732
Sidoarjo 4	38,405	25,981	32,369	21,114	1,991	620	1,329	7,561	41	194	0	15,611	127	9,398	2,780	538	1,656	499	160,214
Sidoarjo 5	43,814	32,750	27,827	7,597	13,856	1,701	1,069	14,611	222	535	0	10,791	259	6,845	5,438	1,134	13,498	1,385	183,332
Sidoarjo 6	37,905	24,932	31,279	17,684	6,331	1,678	547	12,287	189	403	0	26,588	222	4,759	8,891	1,540	899	1,607	177,741
Total	298,735	188,307	198,561	93,690	60,481	8,208	6,883	64,620	1,265	2,766	0	94,637	1,688	59,355	30,777	6,527	27,800	7,775	1,152,075
Source: General Elections Commission of Indonesia

== Composition ==
The following is the composition of members of the Sidoarjo Regency Regional House of Representatives in the last five periods.

Party	Total seats				
Party	2004–2009	2009–2014	2014–2019	2019–2024	2024–2029
PKB seats	16	▼10	▲13	▲16	▼15
Gerindra seats		2	▲7	7	▲9
PDI-P seats	8	▼7	▲8	▲9	9
Golkar seats	6	▼4	▲5	▼4	▲5
NasDem seats			1	▲2	2
PKS seats	2	▲3	3	▲4	▼3
Hanura seats		3	▼0	0	0
PAN seats	6	▲8	▼7	▼5	▼4
PBB seats	0	0	▲1	▼0	0
Demokrat seats	6	▲11	▼4	▼2	2
PPP seats	0	0	▲1	1	1
PDS seats	1	▼0			
PKNU seats		2			
Total Seats	45	▲50	50	50	50
Total Party	7	▲9	▲10	▼9	9

== Electoral District ==
In the 2019 Legislative Election and the 2024 Legislative Election, the Sidoarjo Regency Regional House of Representatives election was divided into 6 electoral districts as follows:

Electoral District Name	Electoral District Area	Number of Seats (2019)	Number of Seats (2024)
SIDOARJO 1	Buduran, Sedati, Sidoarjo	10	10
SIDOARJO 2	Candi, Jabon, Porong, Tanggulangin	8	▲9
SIDOARJO 3	Krembung, Prambon, Tulangan, Wonoayu	8	8
SIDOARJO 4	Balongbendo, Krian, Tarik	7	7
SIDOARJO 5	Sukodono, Taman	9	▼8
SIDOARJO 6	Gedangan, Waru	8	8
TOTAL		50	50

== See also ==
- East Java Regional House of Representatives
- Sidoarjo Regency
- East Java
