= Surabaya–Gempol Toll Road =

Toll road in East Java

- Jalan Tol Surabaya–Gempol
- Surgem Toll Road
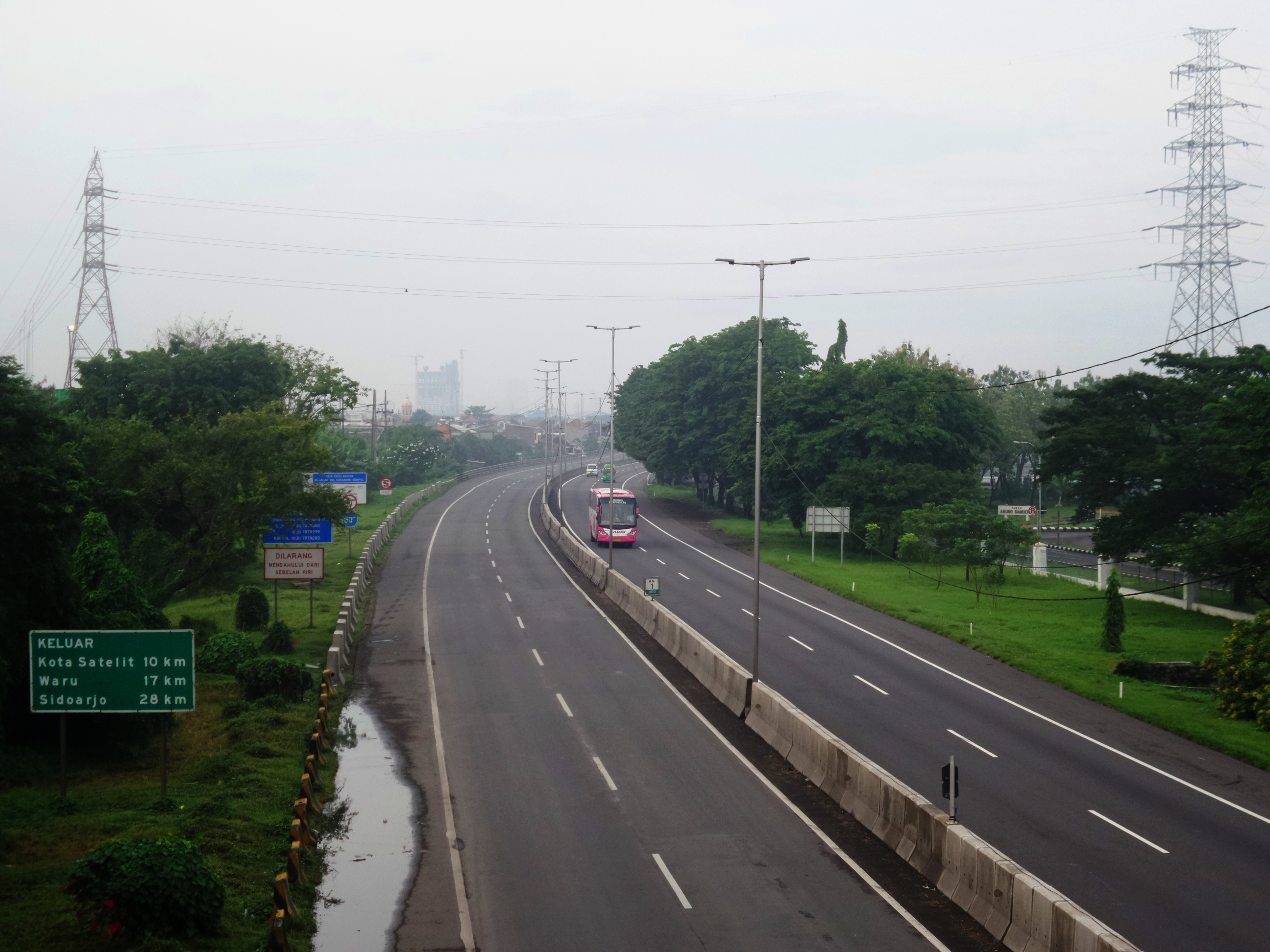
- Surabaya–Gempol Toll Road in Surabaya in 2017

Route information
- Part of AH2
- Maintained by PT. Jasamarga
- Length: 37 km (23 mi)
- Existed: 1986–present

Major junctions
- North end: Port of Tanjung Perak
- Surabaya–Gresik Toll Road; AH2 – Surabaya–Mojokerto Toll Road; Waru-Juanda Toll Road; AH2 – Gempol-Pasuruan Toll Road; Gempol-Pandaan Toll Road
- South end: Gempol

Location
- Country: Indonesia
- Major cities: Surabaya; Sidoarjo Regency; Pasuruan Regency

Highway system
- Transport in Indonesia

Surabaya–Gempol Toll Road (Surgem) is a controlled-access toll road in East Java, Indonesia. This 37 kilometers (23 mi) highway connects Surabaya City in the north with Porong in the south. This toll road passes Surabaya and Sidoarjo. It is part of the Trans-Java Toll Road. The original length of this toll road from Surabaya to Gempol was 43 kilometers (27 mi) long, but the 6 kilometers (3.7 mi) part of this toll road is closed due to the overflow of Lapindo Mudflow that has inundated the Porong–Gempol section of the Surabaya–Gempol toll road since 2006.

== History ==
The toll road has been operating since 1986 and has served as the primary access for Surabaya-Malang or Surabaya-Pasuruan routes, which are among East Java's main industrial areas.

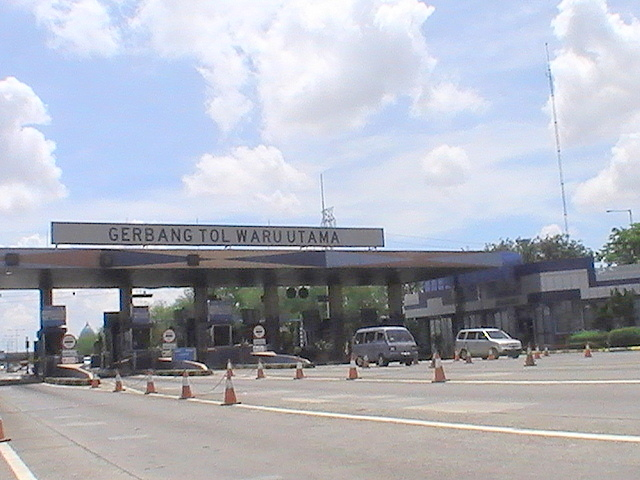
Waru Utama Toll Gate (pictured in 2010) serves as the main toll gate heading to downtown Surabaya

Since August 2006, this toll road has been disrupted due to the mud flood event that inundated this toll road at a point 36 kilometers (22 mi) from Surabaya, specifically in Siring Village, Porong Sub-district, Sidoarjo Regency. The Porong–Gempol Toll Road is basically a relocation of Porong–Gempol segment of the Surabaya–Gempol Toll Road that was drowned by mud flow; it was inaugurated on 20 December 2018.

== Toll gates ==
Province	Location	km	mi	Exit	Name	Destinations	Notes
East Java	Krembangan, Surabaya	0	0.0	0 (775)	Tanjung Perak Ramp	Port of Tanjung Perak	Northern terminus
East Java	Asemrowo, Surabaya	3.2	2.0	3 (772)	Dupak Interchange	Eastbound; Dupak; Pasar Turi; Westbound; Surabaya–Gresik Toll Road	
East Java	Sukomanunggal, Surabaya	5.2	3.2	5 (770)	Banyu Urip Toll Gate	Banyu Urip; Pasar Kembang; Tandes	
East Java	Sukomanunggal, Surabaya	9	5.6	9 (766)	Kota Satelit Toll Gate	Kota Satelit; Dukuh Kupang; Darmo	
East Java	Wiyung, Surabaya	11.8	7.3	12 (763)	Gunung Sari Toll Gate	Gunung Sari; Wonokromo; Karangpilang	
East Java	Jambangan, Surabaya	15	9.3	15 (760)	Jambangan Ramp	Jambangan; Menanggal; Al-Akbar Mosque	South-bound exit only
East Java	Taman, Sidoarjo Regency	745	463	16 (758)	Waru Interchange	Eastbound; Waru; Waru–Juanda Toll Road; Westbound; Surabaya–Mojokerto Toll Road	
East Java	Taman, Sidoarjo Regency	745	463	Waru Utama Toll Gate (central toll gate heading into downtown Surabaya)			
East Java	Sidoarjo, Sidoarjo Regency	756	470	28 (770)	Sidoarjo Toll Gate	Sidoarjo; Krian	
East Java	Tanggulangin, Sidoarjo Regency	763	474	35 (777)	Tanggulangin Ramp	Tanggulangin; Porong	South-bound exit & North-bound entry only
East Java	Gempol, Pasuruan Regency	769	478	Kejapanan Toll Gate (central toll gate from/to Gempol)			
East Java	Gempol, Pasuruan Regency	769	478	41 (783)	Kejapanan Ramp	Kejapanan; Tanggulangin; Porong	South-bound entry & North-bound exit only
East Java	Gempol, Pasuruan Regency	772	480	44 (786)	Gempol Toll Gate	Gempol; Jabon	
East Java	Beji, Pasuruan Regency	775	482	47 (789)	Beji Interchange	Gempol–Pasuruan Toll Road	
East Java	Beji, Pasuruan Regency	776	482	Gempol–Pandaan Toll Road			
1.000 mi = 1.609 km; 1.000 km = 0.621 mi: Electronic toll collection; Incomplete access; Route transition
