= Surabaya–Mojokerto Toll Road =

Toll Road in Indonesia

Surabaya-Mojokerto Toll Road
- Jalan Tol Surabaya–Mojokerto
- Sumo Toll Road
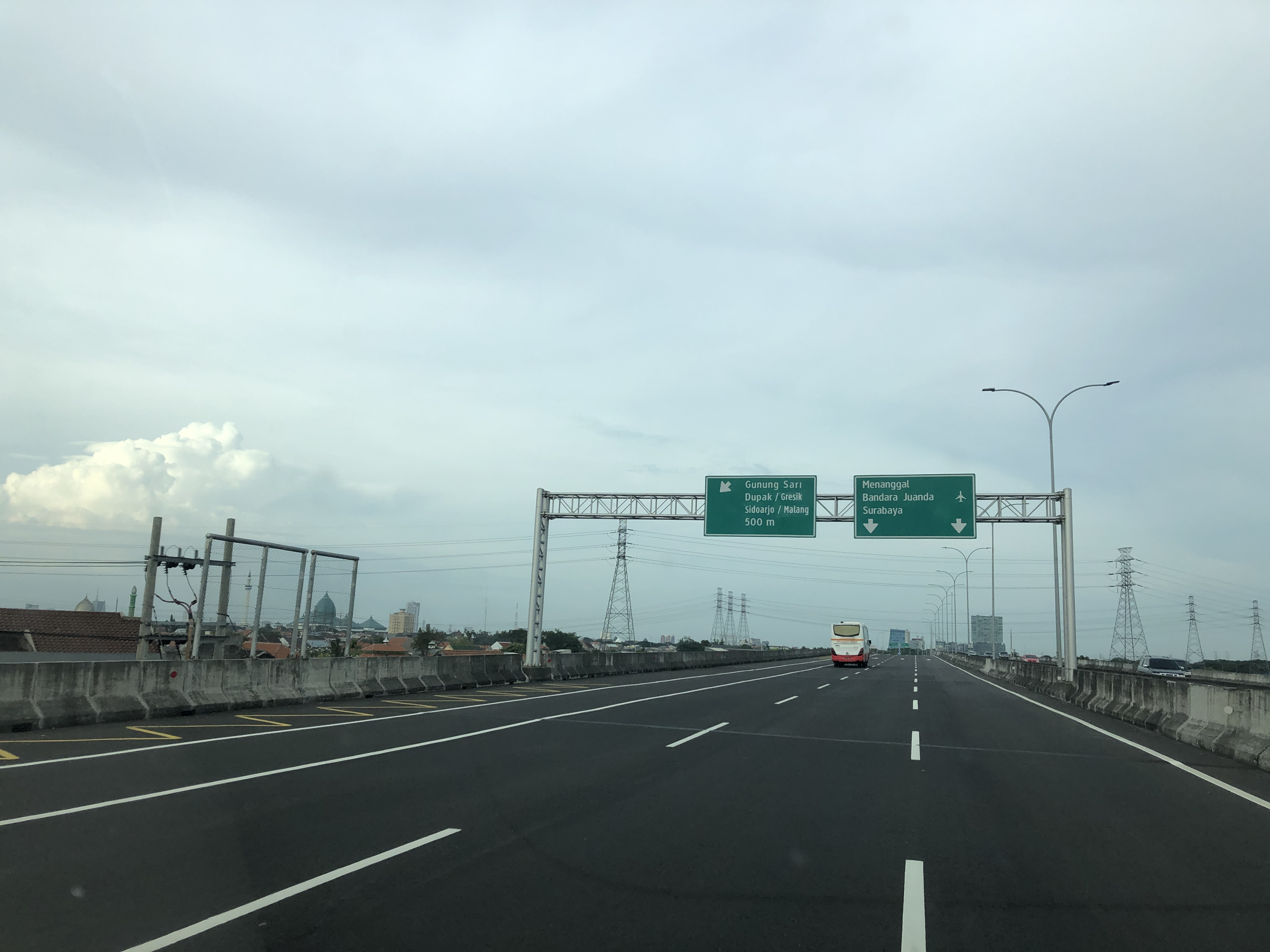
- Eastbound Surabaya–Mojokerto Toll Road heading to Surabaya in 2019

Route information
- Part of AH2
- Maintained by PT Jasamarga Surabaya Mojokerto (PT Jasa Marga Tbk, Moeladi family, and PT Wijaya Karya Tbk)
- Length: 36.27 km (22.54 mi)

Major junctions
- West end: Mojokerto
- AH2 – Kertosono–Mojokerto Toll Road; KLBM Toll Road; AH2 – Surabaya–Gempol Toll Road; Waru–Juanda Toll Road
- East end: Waru Interchange

Location
- Country: Indonesia
- Provinces: East Java
- Major cities: Mojokerto Regency; Gresik Regency; Surabaya

Highway system
- Transport in Indonesia

Surabaya–Mojokerto Toll Road or Sumo Toll Road, (Indonesian: Jalan Tol Surabaya-Mojokerto) is a controlled-access toll road in East Java, Indonesia. The length of the toll road is 36.1 kilometres.

This toll road connects the city of Surabaya (largest city in East Java) and Mojokerto Regency, in the west this toll road is connected with Kertosono–Mojokerto Toll Road.

== History ==
The construction of this toll road began in 2007. Parts of the toll that has been operating is the 2.3-kilometre section IA (Waru–Sepanjang, inaugurated 27 August 2011) as well as the 18.47-kilometre section IV (Krian–Mojokerto, inaugurated 19 March 2016). While sections IB 4.3 km (Sepanjang-WRR), II 5.1 km (WRR-Driyorejo), and III 6.1 km (Driyorejo–Krian) are planned to be fully operational in 2017.

Indonesian President Joko Widodo inaugurated Section 1B, 2 and 3 of the toll road on 19 December 2017, thus the total length of the toll road was now fully operational.

== Sections ==
Sumo Toll Road has following sections,

- Section 1A : 2.3 km of toll road connecting Waru and Sepanjang,
- Section 1B : 4.3 km of toll road connecting Sepanjang and Western Ring Road;
- Section 2 : 5.1 km of toll road connecting Western Ring Road and Driyorejo;
- Section 3 : 6.1 km of toll road connecting Driyorejo and Krian; and
- Section 4 : 18.47 km of toll road connecting Krian and Mojokerto.

== Exits ==
Province	Location	km	mi	Exit	Name	Destinations	Notes
East Java	Jetis, Mojokerto Regency	0	0.0	712 (726)	Penompo Toll Gate	Mojokerto; Mojosari; Balongbendo; Kertosono–Mojokerto Toll Road	Western terminus
East Java	Wringinanom, Gresik Regency	11.42	7.10	724 (738)	Wringinanom Interchange	Krian–Legundi–Bunder–Manyar Toll Road; Northbound; Gresik; Lamongan; Tuban; Southbound; Krian; Wringinanom; Balongbendo	Partially functioning from 31 December 2022 – 3 January 2023.
East Java	Driyorejo, Gresik Regency	16.25	10.10	729 (743)	Krian Toll Gate	Krian; Cerme; Mojosari	
East Java	Driyorejo, Gresik Regency	21.95	13.64	735 (749)	Driyorejo Toll Gate	Driyorejo; Lakarsantri; Benowo	
East Java	Karangpilang, Surabaya	28.46	17.68	Warugunung Toll Plaza (Main toll plaza)			
East Java	Karangpilang, Surabaya	29.86	18.55	742 (756)	Karangpilang Toll Gate	Karangpilang; Wonokromo; Wiyung	Eastbound exit, westbound entrance only
East Java	Taman, Sidoarjo Regency	32.09	19.94	745 (759)	Waru Interchange	Northbound; Surabaya–Gempol Toll Road; Gunung Sari; Surabaya–Gresik Toll Road; Southbound; Surabaya–Gempol Toll Road; Sidoarjo; Pasuruan; Malang	Eastern terminus of Toll Road 11
East Java	Waru, Sidoarjo Regency	33.00	20.51	Waru–Juanda Toll Road			
1.000 mi = 1.609 km; 1.000 km = 0.621 mi: Electronic toll collection; Incomplete access; Route transition; Unopened
