= Pagerwojo railway station =

Railway station in Indonesia

Pagerwojo Station Stasiun Pagerwojo
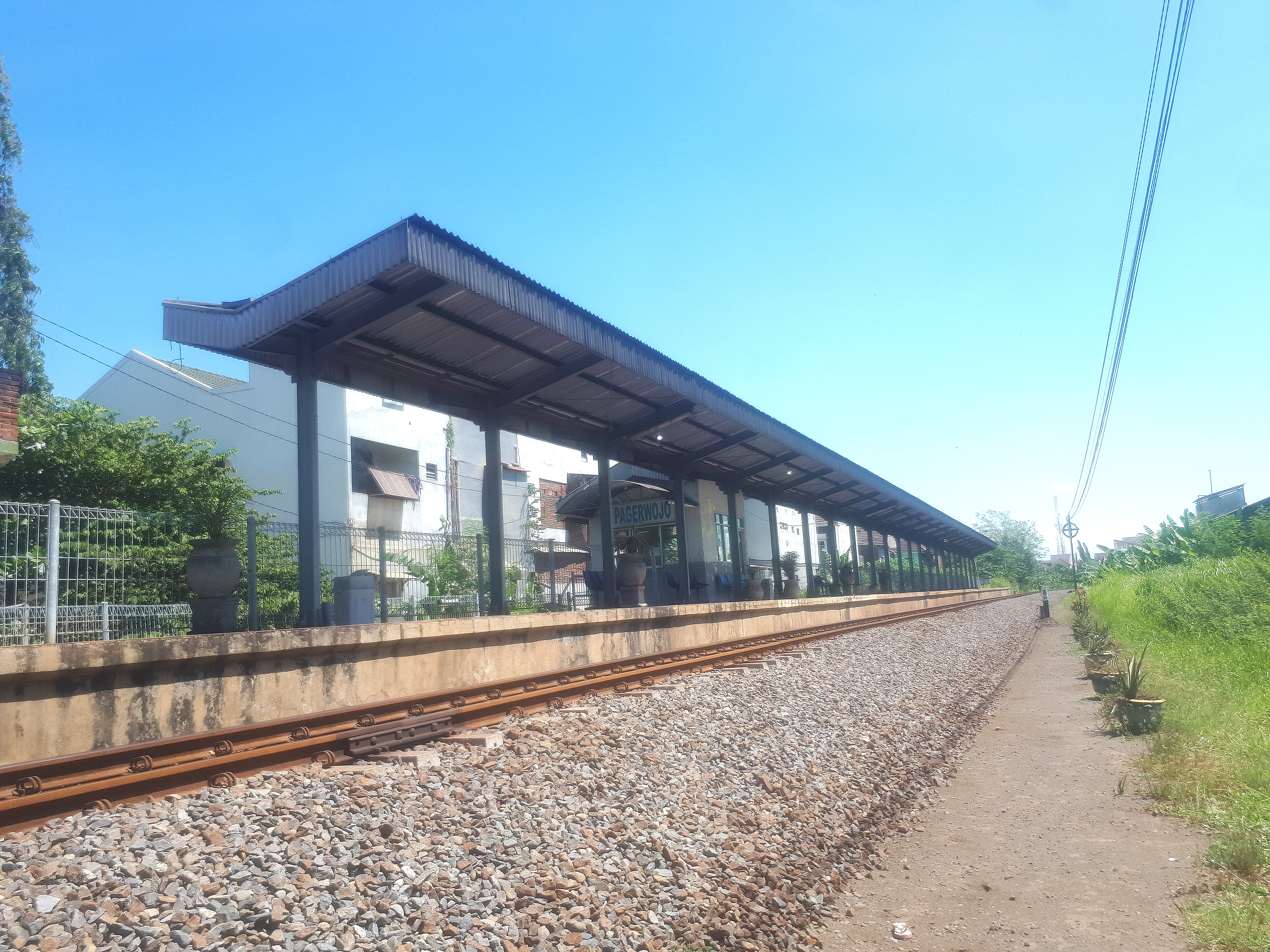
- Pagerwojo Station platform on 11 October 2020

General information
- Location: Pucang, Sidoarjo, Sidoarjo Regency; East Java; Indonesia
- Coordinates: 7.44174°S 112.715°E
- Owner: Kereta Api Indonesia
- Operator: Kereta Api Indonesia
- Line: Wonokromo–Bangil
- Platforms: 1 side platform
- Tracks: 1

Construction
- Structure type: Ground
- Parking: Available
- Accessible: Available

Other information
- Status: Inactive
- Station code: PWJ
- Classification: Halte

History
- Opened: 9 February 2004
- Closed: 10 February 2021
Location
- Location within Sidoarjo Regency

Pagerwojo Station (PWJ) is an inactive railway station located in Pucang, Sidoarjo, Sidoarjo Regency. The station is included in the Operation Area VIII Surabaya. Previously, the station only served the Surabaya–Bangil Commuter service.

This station was inaugurated on 9 February 2004, along with the launch of the Delta Express by President Megawati Soekarnoputri. However, on 10 February 2021, the passenger service at this station was discontinued so that now not a single commuter train service stops at this station.

== Services ==
Starting 10 February 2021 there will be no more passenger services at this station.

== Gallery ==
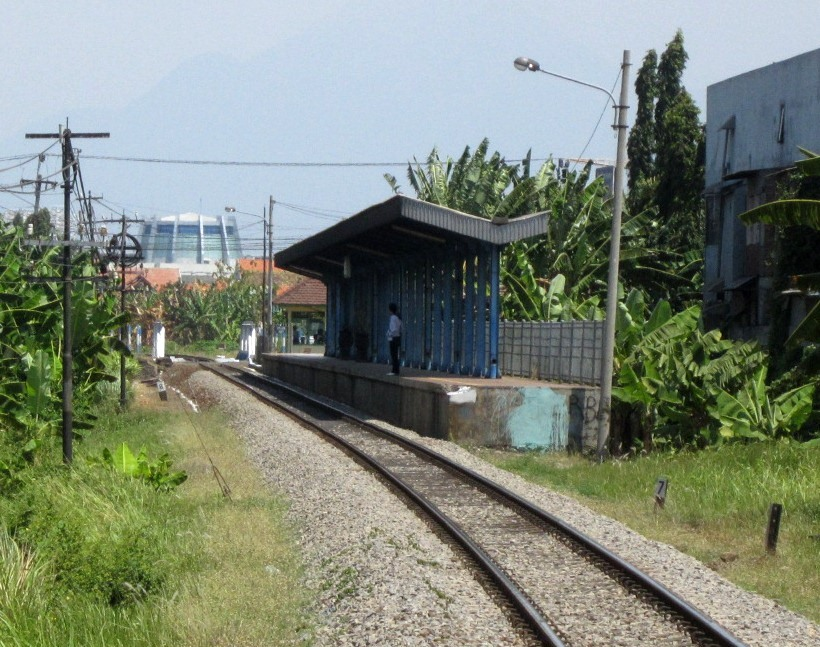
Outside look of Pagerwojo Station, 2011

Preceding station	Kereta Api Indonesia	Following station
~~Buduran~~ towards Wonokromo	Wonokromo–Bangil	Sidoarjo towards Bangil
