= Buduran railway station =

Railway station in Indonesia

Buduran Station Stasiun Buduran
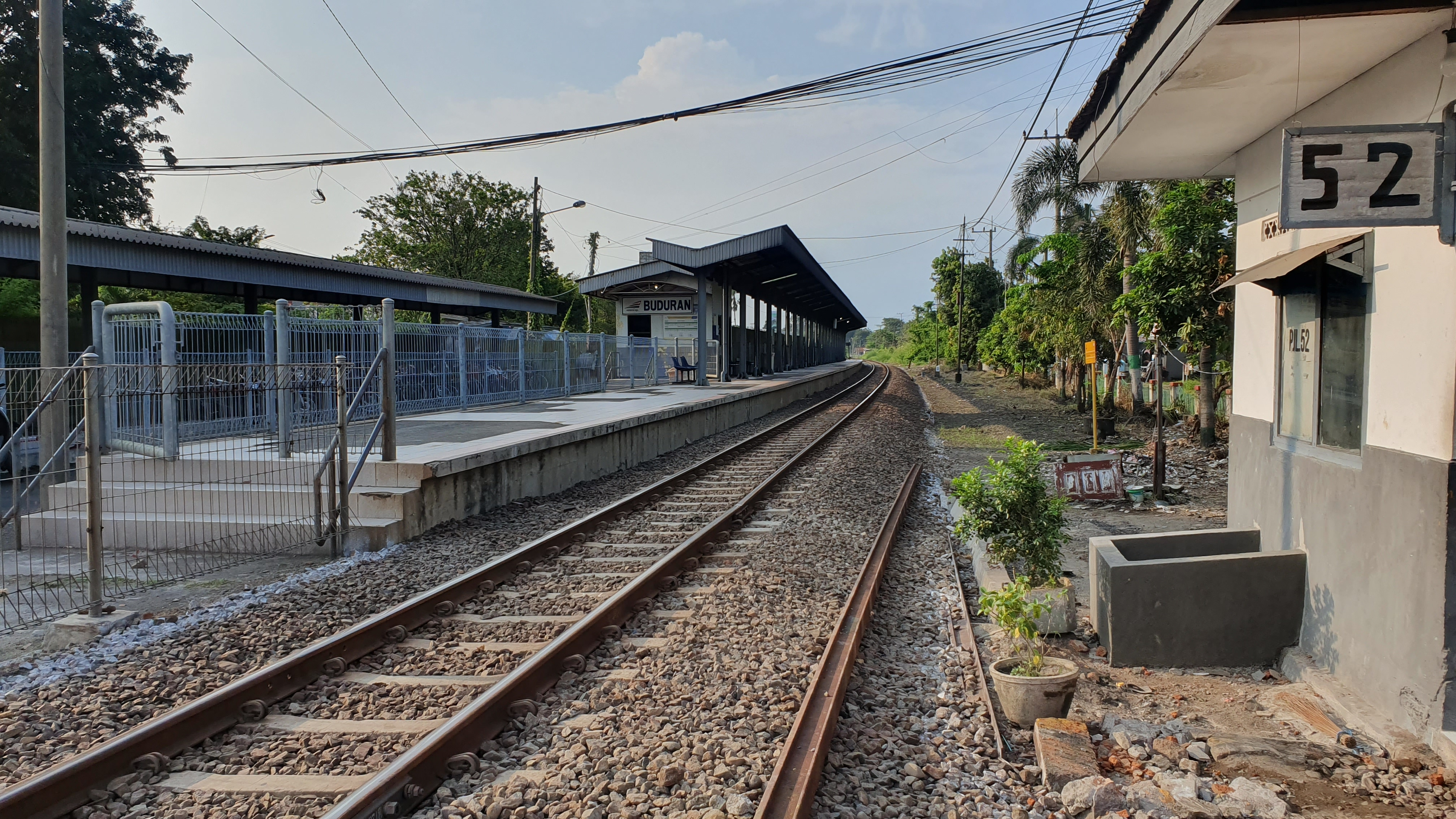
- Buduran Station platform, as of 2019.

General information
- Location: Buduran, Buduran, Sidoarjo Regency; East Java; Indonesia
- Coordinates: 7.4277°S 112.7230°E
- Owner: Kereta Api Indonesia
- Operator: Kereta Api Indonesia
- Line: Wonokromo–Bangil
- Platforms: 1 side platform
- Tracks: 1

Construction
- Structure type: Ground
- Parking: Unavailable
- Accessible: Available

Other information
- Status: Inactive
- Station code: BDR
- Classification: Halt

History
- Opened: 16 May 1878 (original building); 9 February 2004 (current building)
- Closed: 10 February 2021
- Rebuilt: 2003
Location
- Location within Sidoarjo Regency

Buduran Station (BDR) is an inactive railway station located in Buduran, Buduran, Sidoarjo Regency, Indonesia. The station was included in the Operation Area VIII Surabaya. Previously, the station only served the Surabaya–Bangil Commuter service.

About 750 meters to the north of the station there is a museum, namely Mpu Tantular Museum.

== History ==
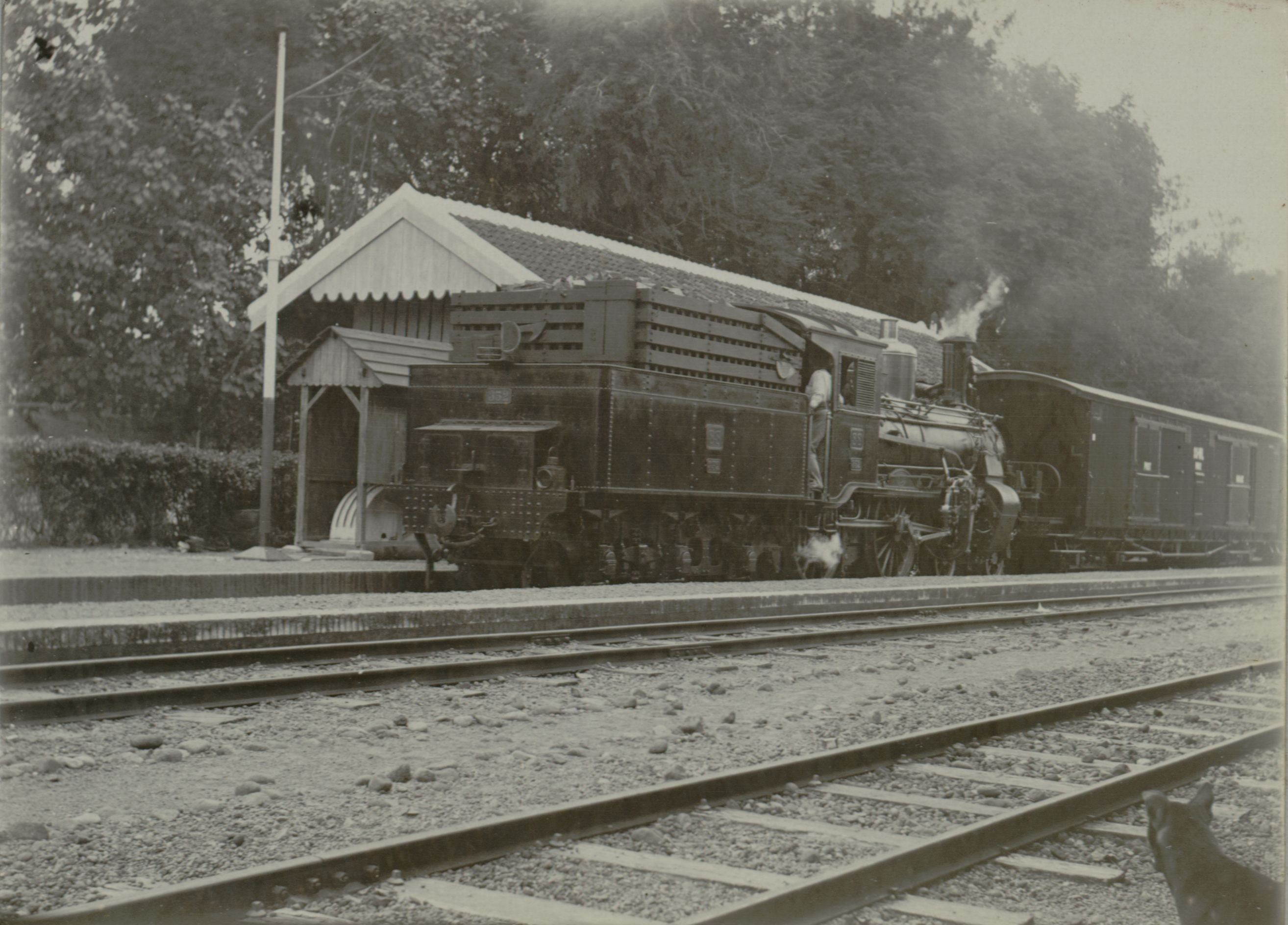
A steam train stopped at Buduran station, circa 1900s.

During the Dutch East Indies era, Staatsspoorwegen once established the status of a railway station in Buduran as a halt, equivalent to a class III or small station, equipped with buildings like other small stations, which were later inactivated. The original station building may have been torn down a long time ago.

On 9 February 2004, along with the launch of the Delta Express, the President Megawati Soekarnoputri was inaugurated the newly rebuilt station building. However, on 10 February 2021, the passenger service at this station was discontinued so that now not a single commuter train service stops at this station.

== Services ==
Starting 10 February 2021 there will be no more passenger services at this station.

Preceding station	Kereta Api Indonesia	Following station
Banjarkemantren towards Wonokromo	Wonokromo–Bangil	~~Pagerwojo~~ towards Bangil
