= Krian–Legundi–Bunder–Manyar Toll Road =

Toll Road in Indonesia

Krian–Legundi–Bunder–Manyar Toll Road (KLBM)

Route information
- Maintained by PT Waskita Bumi Wira (WBW)
- Length: 38.39 km (23.85 mi)
- Existed: November 28, 2020; 4 years ago–present

Major junctions
- South end: Krian
- Tuban–Gresik Toll Road (planned); Surabaya–Gresik Toll Road; AH2 – Surabaya–Mojokerto Toll Road
- North end: Manyar; Surabaya–Gresik Toll Road

Location
- Country: Indonesia
- Major cities: Sidoarjo Regency; Gresik Regency

Highway system
- Transport in Indonesia

Krian–Legundi–Bunder–Manyar Toll Road is a controlled-access toll road that links Krian in Sidoarjo Regency with Manyar in Gresik Regency in East Java. The toll road is planned to be connected with Tuban–Gresik Toll Road at north and Surabaya–Mojokerto Toll Road at south. This toll road was designed to link industrial areas in Surabaya metropolitan area. The connectivity of KLBM Toll Road and Sumo Toll Road is expected to boost investment in Gresik Regency.

== History ==
The construction of this toll road was started in 2017 and consists of 4 sections:

- Section I, Krian-Kedamean (9.45 km (5.87 mi))
- Section II, Kedamean-Boboh (13.53 km (8.41 mi))
- Section III, Boboh-Bunder (6.02 km (3.74 mi))
- Section IV, Bunder-Manyar (9.39 km (5.83 mi))

Sections I, II, and III which links Krian and Bunder along 29 kilometers were inaugurated by the Governor of East Java, Khofifah Indar Parawansa on November 28, 2020. While Section IV was planned to be built on 2021.

== Exits ==
Province	Location	km	mi	Exit	Name	Destinations	Notes
East Java	Balongbendo, Sidoarjo Regency	0	0.0	0	Krian Ramp	Krian; Sidoarjo; Wringinanom	Southern terminus
East Java	Wringinanom, Gresik Regency	2.4	1.5	Lebani Gresik Toll Gate			
East Java	Wringinanom, Gresik Regency	2.8	1.7	3	Lebani Gresik Interchange	Surabaya–Mojokerto Toll Road; Westbound; Mojokerto; Jombang; Kertosono; Eastbound; Krian; Driyorejo; Surabaya	
East Java	Kedamean, Gresik Regency	9.2	5.7	9	Belahanrejo Toll Gate	Belahanrejo; Kedamean	
East Java	Cerme, Gresik Regency	22.8	14.2	23	Cerme Toll Gate	Cerme; Benjeng; Boboh	
East Java	Kebomas, Gresik Regency	27.8	17.3	28	Bunder Gresik Toll Gate	Kebomas; Gresik; Lamongan; Surabaya–Gresik Toll Road	Northern terminus
1.000 mi = 1.609 km; 1.000 km = 0.621 mi: Electronic toll collection; Route transition; Unopened
