= Siantar Top =

Indonesian snacks company

Coordinates: 7.358366°S 112.772894°E

PT Siantar Top Tbk
- Type: Public
- Traded as: IDX: STTP
- Industry: Snacks
- Founded: 1972; 54 years ago
- Founder: Heng Hok Soei
- Headquarters: Sidoarjo, Indonesia
- Area served: Indonesia
- Key people: Osbert Kosasih (chairman); Shindo Sumidomo (CEO)
- Products: Biscuit; Candy; Chocolate; Coffee bean; Cracker; Noodle
- Revenue: ▲ Rp 2.63 trillion (2016)
- Net income: ▲ Rp 170 billion (2016)
- Owners: Shindo Tiara Tunggal (56.76%); Shindo Sumidomo (3.1%); Juwita Wijaya (0.03%)
- Number of employees: 3,128 (2016)
- Website: siantartop.co.id

Siantar Top is an Indonesian snacks and consumer goods company based in Sidoarjo Regency, East Java.

== History ==
The company was founded in 1972 with a small industrial scale at that time. Siantar Top was founded by Shindo Sumidomo (Heng Hok Soei), a businessman from Pematangsiantar, North Sumatra, which was then taken from the name of the city. Then, Siantar Top developed in the snack industry, namely snack noodles, crackers and confectionery (candy). In 1987, the company was registered under the name PT Siantar Top Industri based on deed No. 45 dated May 12, 1987 from Endang Widjajanti, notary in Sidoarjo. In 1991, the company began producing candy variants. The company expanded its business by operating other three factories in Medan (1998), Bekasi (2002), and Makassar (2011). In addition, the company also made a coffee processing plant in 2014.

== Brands and Products ==
- Noodles: Spix Soba Mie Sedap, Spix Mie Goreng, Mie Gemez & Gemez Enaak
- Snacks: Twistko, French Fries 2000 & Leanet, OPotato, TicTic
- Candys: Gaul, Milenium, Tovie & XUXU
- Biscuits: GO! Potato, GO! Malkist, Goriorio, Modena Cookies, Malkrez & Wafer Superman

== Ownerships ==
List of ownership based on shareholders as 31 December 2014

Name of Shareholders	Number of shares	Percentage of Ownerships
Shindo Tiara Tunggal	743,600,500	56.76%
Shindo Sumidomo	40,605,000	3.10%
Juwita Wijaya	933,600	0.03%
Other people	524,860,900	40.11%
