= Dermo Temple =

Candi Dermo
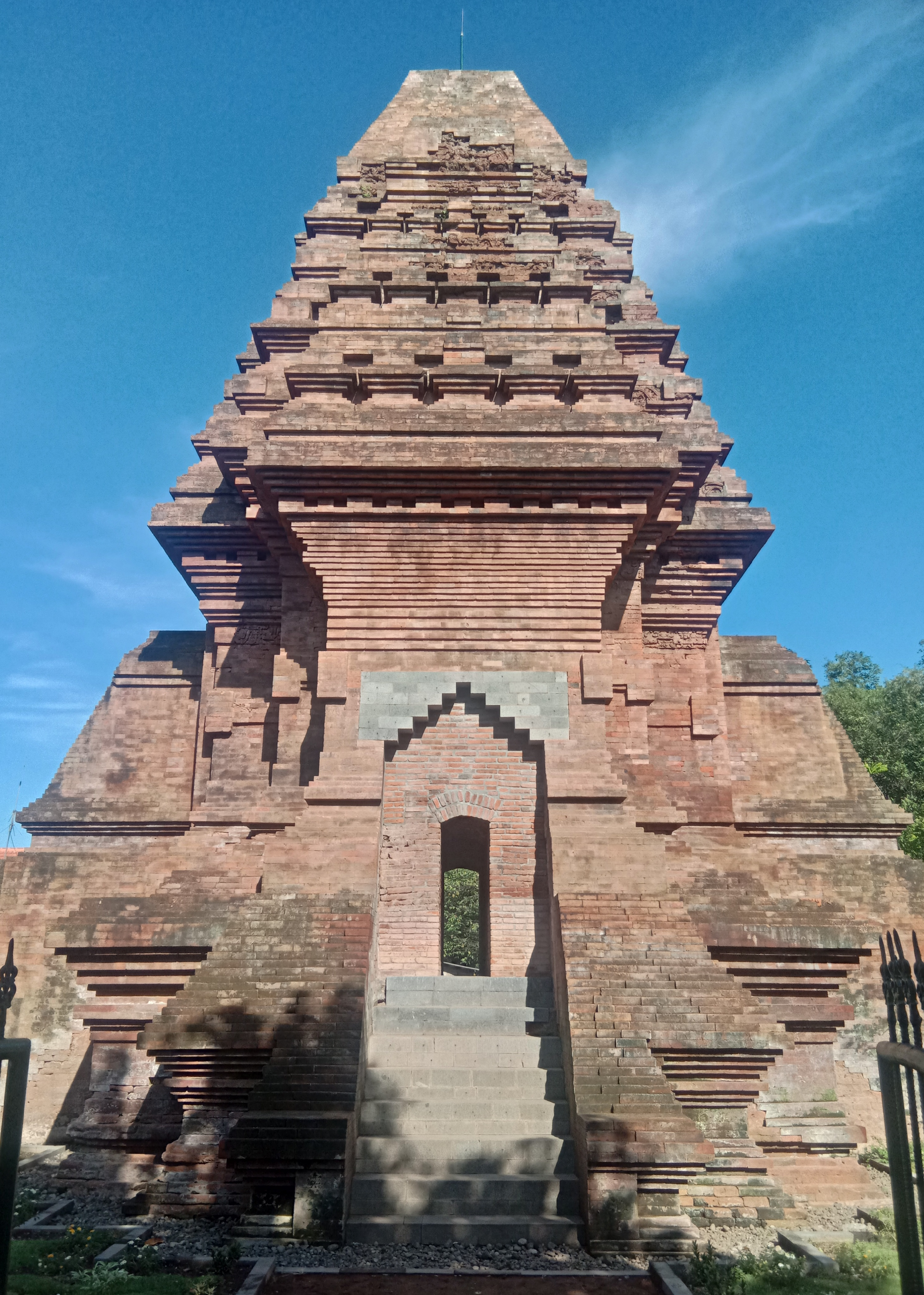
- Front view.

- Location within Indonesia

General information
- Architectural style: Eastern Javanese temple
- Location: Sidoarjo, Jawa Timur, Indonesia
- Coordinates: 7.4075399°S 112.6200128°E

Technical details
- Size: 10.48 x 10.77 x 13.50 m

Dermo Temple is a candi (Indonesian temple) from the classical Hindu-Buddhist period located in Sidoarjo Regency, East Java. This site has several ancient relics such as temple buildings, relief carvings, and stone blocks.

== Location ==
Dermo Temple is located in Santren Hamlet, Candinegoro Village, Wonoayu District, Sidoarjo Regency, East Java Province. On this site, the northern boundary borders a prayer room, the western, southern and eastern borders border residential areas.

To the north of Dermo Temple is the Terung area, which is recorded in the Canggu inscription (1280 saka, 1358 AD) and several other records as one of the ports and crossings on the Bengawan Brantas. The relationship between this temple and the port of Terung is not yet known.

== History ==
The first records regarding Dermo Temple can be seen in Dutch reports written in 1905–1913 and 1914–1915. To know when and who built this temple cannot be ascertained and known, because there are no written sources or year numbers that mention it. It's just that in terms of the building, experts suspect that the Darmo temple originates from the 14th century.

== Architecture ==
Overall, Dermo Temple is a gate in the shape of an Garuda Padu Raksa. In archeology, Garuda Padu Raksa is a gate whose top (roof) is one. The reason Dermo Temple is called a gate is because there is another gate whose top shape is separated as if it were being pulled to the right and left. This form of gate with a separate roof is called benta temple or Bela gate. This gate is similar to the Bajang Ratu Gate, a former legacy of the Majapahit kingdom in Trowulan. The entrance leads to the west and east axis of the remaining parts. It is known that this gate used to have a wall or wing fence.

== Restoration ==
This temple has never been restored since it was built. Restoration was initially planned to begin in 2014, but was delayed and only started in 2015.

In December 2020, Dermo Temple was completely restored. All bamboo supports were removed from the building, then inaugurated by the East Java Cultural Heritage Conservation Board (BPCB), and was opened for visits by the general public.
