= Pandaan–Malang Toll Road =

Toll Road in East Java, Indonesia

Pandaan–Malang Toll Road (MAPAN)
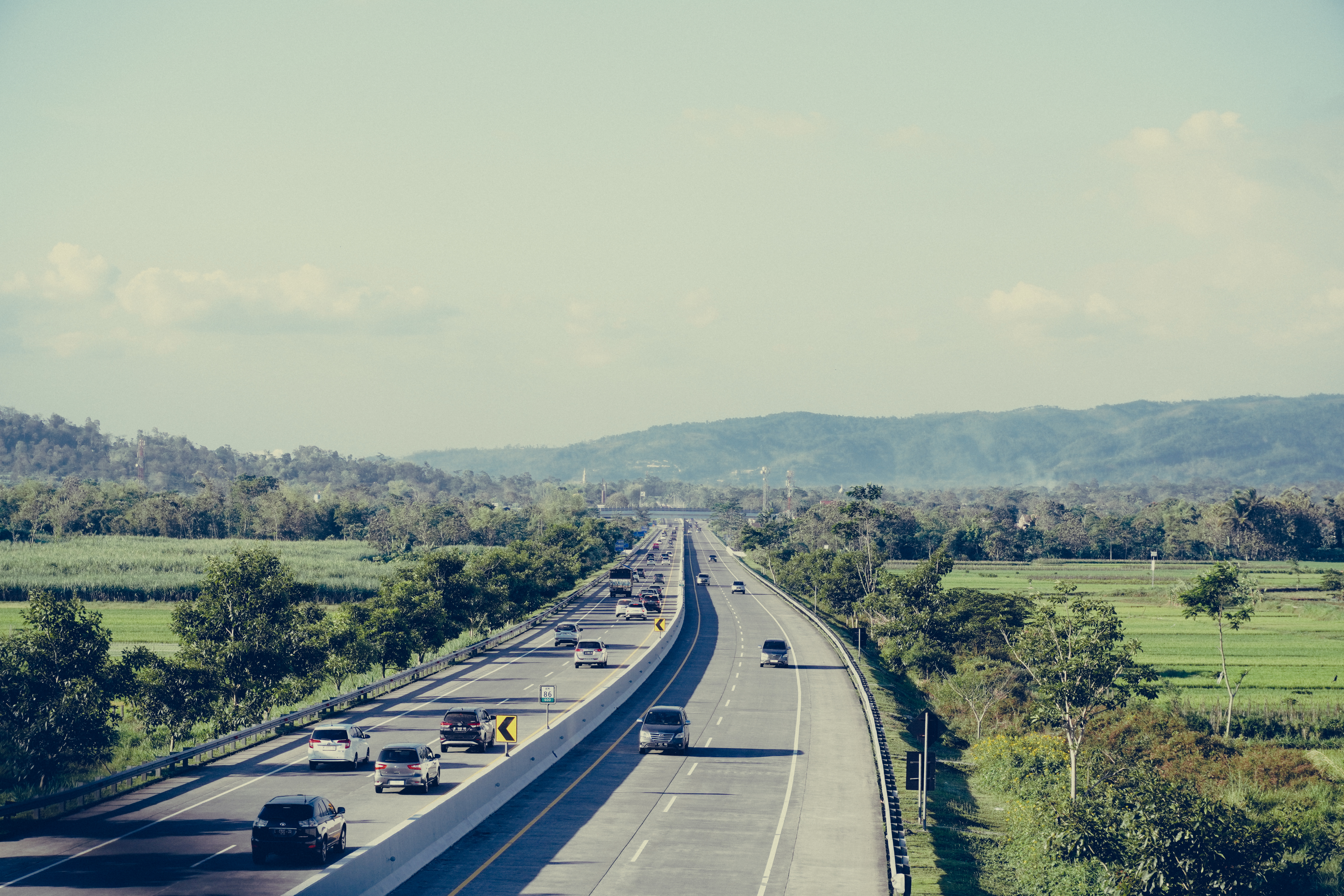
- Section III of Pandaan Malang Toll Road.

Route information
- Part of AH2
- Maintained by PT Jasamarga Pandaan Malang (PT Jasa Marga Tbk, PT Pembangunan Perumahan Tbk, PT Sarana Multi Infrastruktur)
- Length: 38.48 km (23.91 mi)
- Existed: 2018–present

Major junctions
- North end: Pandaan
- Gempol–Pandaan Toll Road; Malang–Kepanjen Toll Road (Planned)
- South end: Malang

Location
- Country: Indonesia
- Major cities: Pasuruan Regency; Malang Regency; Malang

Highway system
- Transport in Indonesia

Pandaan–Malang Toll Road is a controlled-access toll road in East Java, Indonesia. This 38.48-kilometre (23.91 mi) highway connects Malang city with Pandaan of Pasuruan Regency. The toll road will reduce traffic movement of arterial roads and national roads, which facilitates industrial transportation to Malang and Batu city. The toll road reduced the travel time of Pandaan-Pasuruan-Malang to less than an hour.

== History ==
This toll road has built in 2016. In March 2017, land acquisition for this toll road is only 67%. Construction was hampered by the discovery of a historical site dating back to the Singhasari Kingdom in March 2019 in section 5 of the 37th kilometer, Dusun Sekaran, Sekarpuro Village, Pakis District, Malang Regency, so the toll road was shifted eight meters to the banks of the Amprong River. The 30.62-kilometer sections I, II, and III connecting Pandaan and Singosari were inaugurated by President Joko Widodo on 13 May 2019. The 4.75-kilometer Section IV connecting Singosari and Pakis has been in operation since November 1, 2019. Meanwhile, the 3.11-kilometer section V between Pakis and Madyopuro began operating on April 7, 2020.

== Sections ==
Pandaan-Malang toll road is divided into five sections,

- Section I: Pandaan-Purwodadi is 15.47 km
- Section II: Purwodadi-Lawang 8.05 km
- Section III: Lawang-Singosari 7.10 km
- Section IV: Singosari-Pakis 4.75 km
- Section V: Pakis-Malang 3.11 km

== Exits ==
| Province | Location | km | mi | Exit | Name | Destinations | Notes |
|---|---|---|---|---|---|---|---|
| East Java | Pandaan, Pasuruan Regency | 56.0 | 34.8 | Gempol–Pandaan Toll Road | | | |
| East Java | Pandaan, Pasuruan Regency | 56.6 | 35.2 | 56 (798) | Pandaan Toll Gate | Pandaan; Prigen; Sukorejo | Northern Terminus |
| East Java | Purwodadi, Pasuruan Regency | 72.2 | 44.9 | 72 (814) | Purwodadi Toll Gate | Purwodadi; Purwodadi Botanical Garden; Purwosari | |
| East Java | Lawang, Malang Regency | 79.9 | 49.6 | 80 (822) | Lawang Toll Gate | Lawang | |
| East Java | Singosari, Malang Regency | 88.1 | 54.7 | 88 (830) | Singosari Toll Gate | Singosari; Batu | |
| East Java | Pakis, Malang Regency | 93.0 | 57.8 | 93 (835) | Pakis Toll Gate | Pakis; Abdul Rachman Saleh Airport | |
| East Java | Kedungkandang, Malang | 96.0 | 59.7 | 96 (838) | Malang Toll Gate | Malang; Kepanjen | Southern terminus |
| East Java | Kedungkandang, Malang | 96.4 | 59.9 | Malang–Kepanjen Toll Road | | | |
1.000 mi = 1.609 km; 1.000 km = 0.621 mi: Route transition; Unopened
