= Kedawung Setia Industrial =

Indonesian home appliance manufacturing

Coordinates: 7.349699°S 112.670279°E

PT Kedawung Setia Industrial Tbk

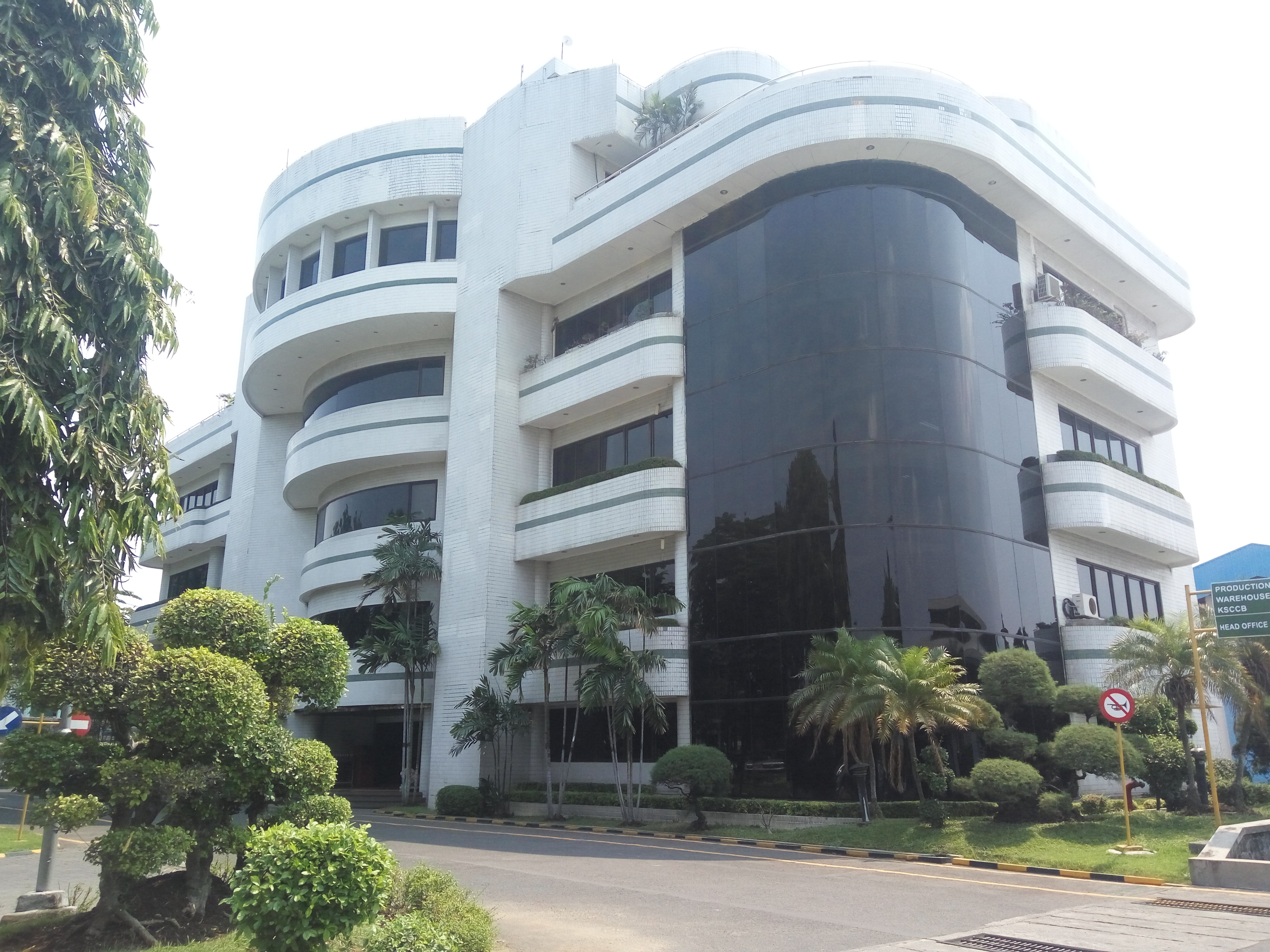
- Headquarters of Kedawung Setia Industrial
- Company type: Public company
- Traded as: IDX: KDSI
- Industry: Home appliance
- Founded: 9 January 1973; 52 years ago
- Founders: Noto Suhardjo Wibisono; Agus Nursalim
- Headquarters: Surabaya, Indonesia
- Area served: Worldwide
- Products: Enamelware; Paperboard; Cookware and bakeware; Stainless steel
- Number of employees: 1,814 (2016)
- Website: kedawungsetia.com

Kedawung Setia Industrial or commonly known as Kedawung is an Indonesian home appliance manufacturing company based in Surabaya, East Java. Kedawung was founded in 1973 by Noto Suhardjo Wibisono and Agus Nursalim. which manufactured mainly enamelware.

== History ==
Kedawung was founded by Noto Suhardjo Wibisono and Agus Nursalim on 9 January 1973. Kedawung at the time was manufactured mainly enamelware. In 1975 Kedawung commercially turned into a limited company.

Kedawung Setia Industrial's main business activities are engaged in enamel-plated household appliances and through its subsidiary PT Kedawung Setia Corrugated Carton Box Industrial (KDSI) runs a business in the field of wave cardboard boxes and egg storage. In addition, KDSI is also developing the business by producing enamel-plated construction items (can be used for the roof of the stadium and mosque dome) and plasting mats made from polypropylene plastic seeds.

On June 28, 1996, KDSI obtained an effective license from Bapepam-LK to conduct an initial public offering (IPO). These shares were listed on the Surabaya Stock Exchange (now Indonesian Stock Exchange) on July 29, 1996.

== See also ==
- Vitreous enamel
- List of companies of Indonesia
