= Suparma =

Indonesian pulp and paper company

Coordinates: 7.349409°S 112.673401°E

PT Suparma Tbk

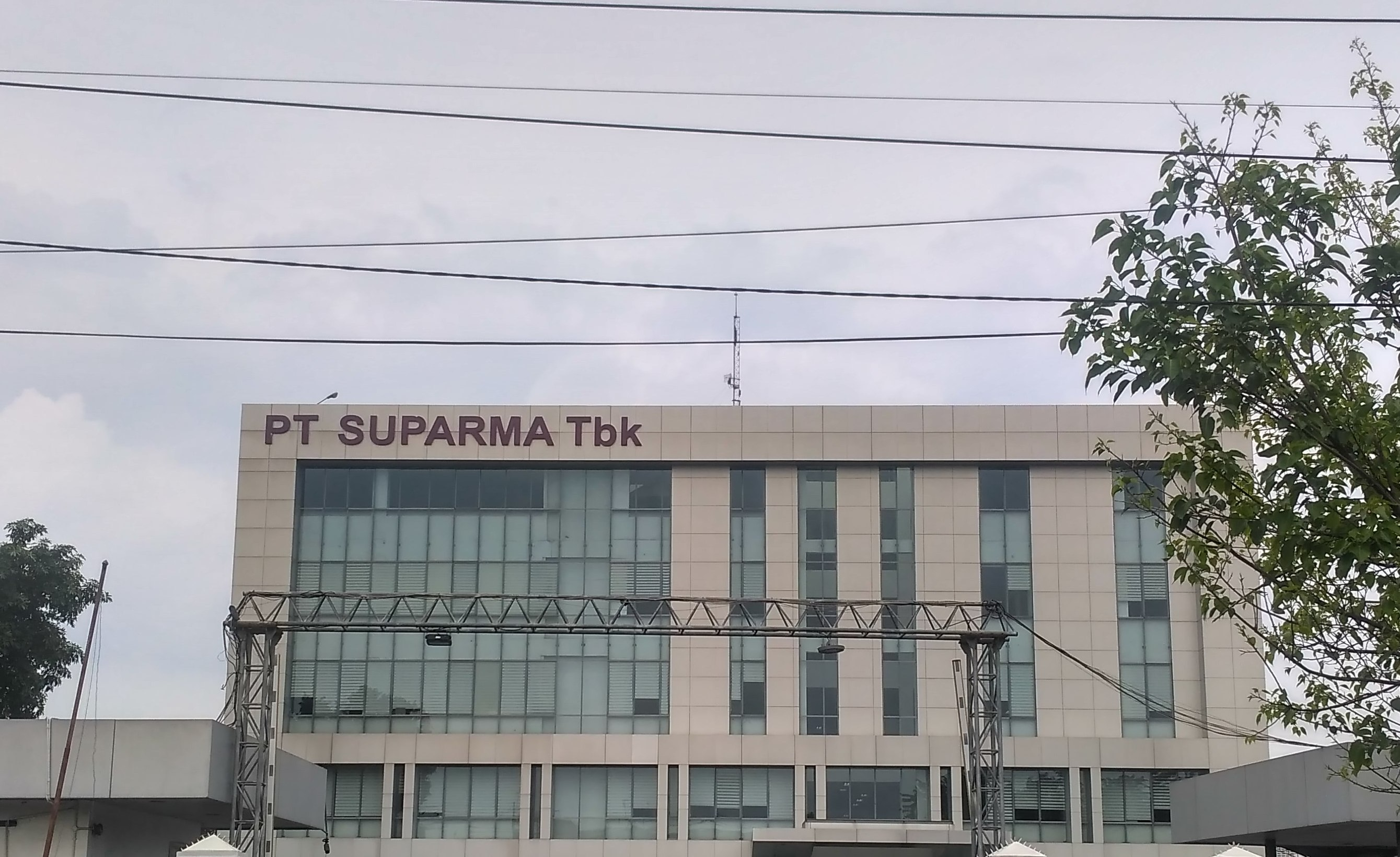
- Headquarters of PT Suparma Tbk
- Company type: Public
- Traded as: IDX: SPMA
- ISIN: ID1000054307
- Industry: Pulp and paper
- Founded: 25 August 1976; 49 years ago
- Founder: Welly
- Headquarters: Surabaya, Indonesia
- Area served: Worldwide
- Key people: Welly (Presiden Director); Edward Sopanan (Director); Joseph Sulaiman (Commissioner)
- Products: Paper; Tissue
- Brands: Plenty; See-U
- Website: ptsuparmatbk.com

Suparma is an Indonesian pulp and paper company based in Surabaya, East Java. Suparma was founded in 1976 by Welly.

== History ==
Suparma was founded on 25 August 1976 by Welly in Surabaya. In April 1978, Suparma commercially turned into a limited company. The company operates in papermaking. Suparma produces various types of paper which can be classified into two major groups, namely industrial products and consumer products. Suparma products include layered duplex boards, non-layered duplex boards, written and printed paper, samson kraft paper, kraft packaging, striped kraft, bread laminating, newsprint, PE laminating kraft, manifold paper, MG paper, hand towels, tissue paper, and others.

In 1984 the company decided to roll out her first expansion program by adding three units of paper machine and raised its total production capacity to 51,000 ton per year.

In 1992, Suparma invested another two units of paper machine with capacity of 99,000 tons per year to accommodate the strong increase of paper demand in the market in tandem with the Indonesian government industrialization program.

Suparma sells domestic products and exports to Malaysia, Vietnam, Korea, Taiwan, the Philippines and other countries. Suparma was listed on the Surabaya Stock Exchange (now Indonesia Stock Exchange) in 1994.

== Products ==
- Laminated Wrapping Kraft
- Samson Kraft
- MG Paper
- Coated Duplex Board
- Sandwiched Ribbed Kraft Recycle
- Bathroom Tissue
- Facial Tissue
- Napkin Tissue
- Carrier Tissue
- Hand Towel
- Industrial Roll Towel
- Clinical Roll Towel
- Kitchen Towel

== See also ==
- List of paper mills
- List of companies of Indonesia
