= Gempol–Pandaan Toll Road =

Toll road in East Java

- Jalan Tol Gempol–Pandaan
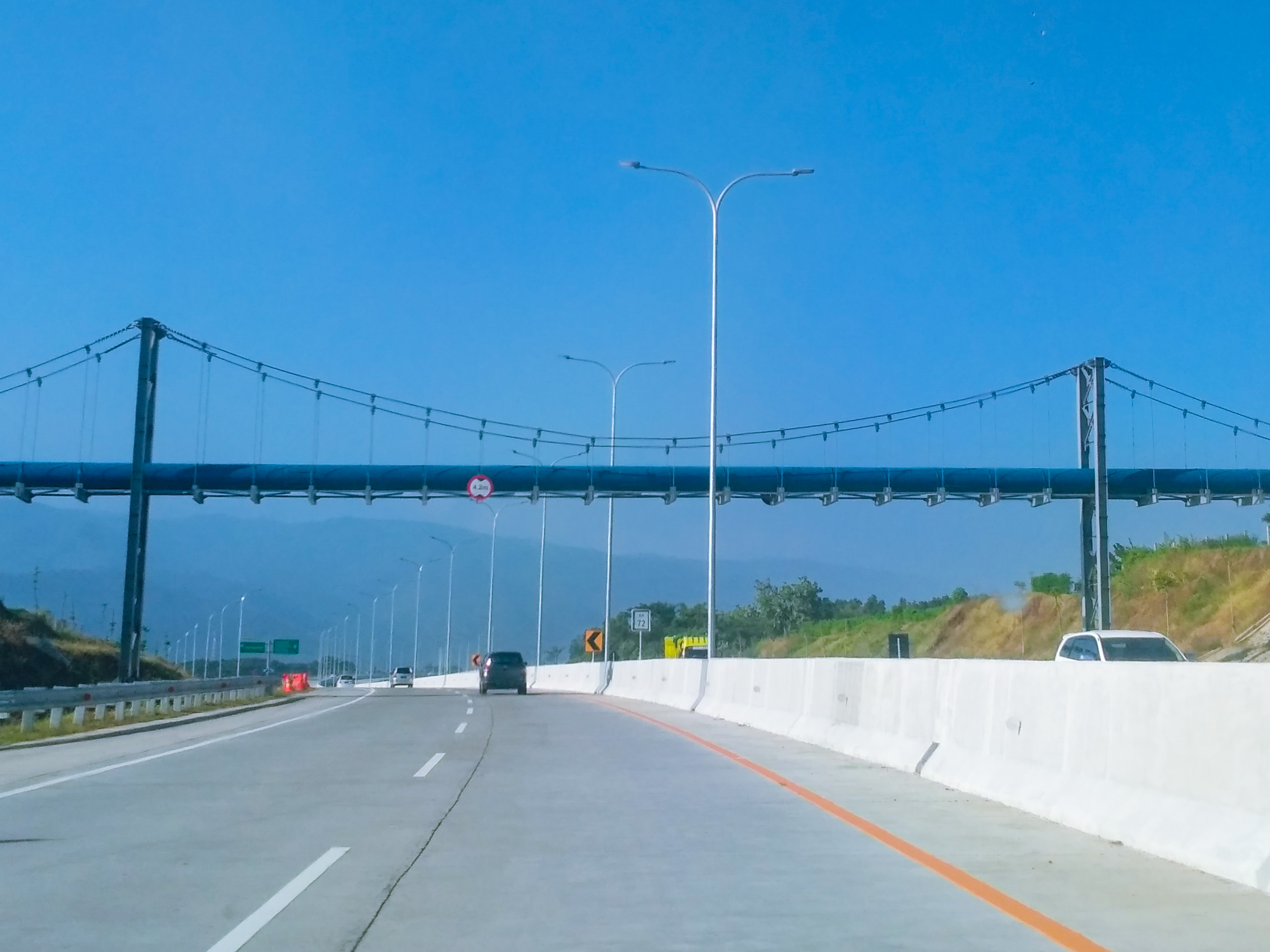
- Southbound Gempol–Pandaan Toll Road heading to Pandaan, Pasuruan Regency in 2019

Route information
- Part of AH2
- Maintained by PT Jasamarga Pandaan Tol
- Length: 13 km (8.1 mi)
- Existed: 2015–present

Major junctions
- North end: Gempol
- AH2 – Surabaya–Porong Toll Road; AH2 – Gempol-Pasuruan Toll Road; Pandaan-Malang Toll Road
- South end: Pandaan

Location
- Country: Indonesia
- Major cities: Pasuruan Regency

Highway system
- Transport in Indonesia

Gempol–Pandaan Toll Road is a controlled-access toll road in East Java, Indonesia. This 13.6 kilometers (8.5 mi) highway connects Gempol and with Pandaan of Pasuruan Regency. The toll road was opened in May 2015. This toll road is a continuation of the Surabaya–Porong Toll Road that will be connected to Pandaan-Malang Toll Road. This toll was built to help lessen the traffic congestion on the existing inter-city roads connecting Surabaya and Malang.

== Toll gate ==
Province	Location	km	mi	Exit	Name	Destinations	Notes
East Java	Beji, Pasuruan Regency	40.0	24.9	47 (789)	Beji Interchange	Eastbound; Gempol–Pasuruan Toll Road; Bangil; Pasuruan–Probolinggo Toll Road; Northbound; Surabaya–Gempol Toll Road; Sidoarjo; Surabaya	
East Java	Pandaan, Pasuruan Regency	56.0	34.8	56 (798)	Pandaan Toll Gate	Pandaan; Taman Safari; Prigen	
East Java	Pandaan, Pasuruan Regency	56.6	35.2	Pandaan-Malang Toll Road			
1.000 mi = 1.609 km; 1.000 km = 0.621 mi: Route transition
