= Surabaya–Gresik Toll Road =

Toll Road in Indonesia

Route information
- Part of AH2
- Maintained by PT Margabumi Matraraya
- Length: 21 km (13 mi)
- Existed: 1993–present

Major junctions
- East end: Dupak Interchange
- AH2 – Surabaya–Porong Toll Road; Krian–Manyar Toll Road
- West end: Manyar

Location
- Country: Indonesia
- Major cities: Surabaya; Gresik Regency

Highway system
- Transport in Indonesia

Surabaya–Gresik Toll Road is a controlled-access toll road in Indonesia, located between Surabaya and Gresik in the island of Java. The highway is 21 kilometers long. The highway acts as a complement for Trans-Java Expressway.

== Description ==
The highway starts on a cloverleaf with the Surabaya–Gempol Toll Road, leads westward with 2x2 lanes, and crosses industrial sites west of Surabaya. The motorway then forms a large bypass of the port city of Gresik, which serves the motorway with two non-level connections. Then the highway ends with a crossroads north of Gresik on a main road that goes further west along the coast.

== Exits ==
Province	Location	km	mi	Exit	Name	Destinations	Notes
East Java	Asemrowo, Surabaya	0.0	0.0	0	Dupak Interchange	Surabaya–Gempol Toll Road; Northbound; Port of Tanjung Perak; Eastbound; Pasar Turi; Southbound; Banyu Urip; Sidoarjo; Pasuruan; Malang	Eastern terminus
East Java	Asemrowo, Surabaya	2.8	1.7	3	Tandes Timur Toll Gate	Tandes; Margomulyo	
East Java	Asemrowo, Surabaya	3.6	2.2	Tandes Barat Toll Gate			
East Java	Benowo, Surabaya	8.6	5.3	8	Romokalisari Junction	Westbound; Tambak Osowilangun; Eastbound; Romokalisari; Gresik	Tambak Osowilangun gate is currently under construction
East Java	Kebomas, Gresik Regency	16.3	10.1	16	Kebomas Interchange	Kebomas; Gresik; Lamongan; Krian–Legundi–Bunder–Manyar Toll Road	
East Java	Manyar, Gresik Regency	20.1	12.5	Manyar Toll Gate			
1.000 mi = 1.609 km; 1.000 km = 0.621 mi: Electronic toll collection; Incomplete access; Route transition; Unopened
