= Panin Sekuritas =

Indonesian financial services company

PT Panin Sekuritas Tbk
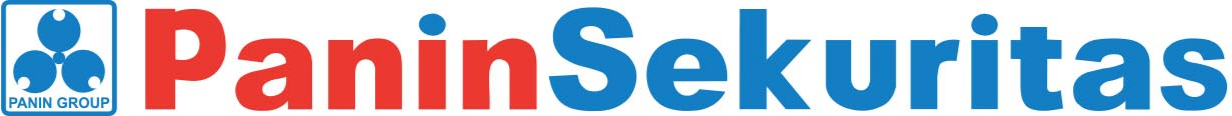
- Company type: Public
- Traded as: IDX: PANS
- Industry: Security
- Founded: 1989
- Headquarters: Jakarta, Indonesia
- Key people: Handrata Sadeli (President Director); Rosmini Lidarjono (Director); Menas K. Shahaan (Director); Indra Christanto (Director)
- Services: Financial
- Revenue: ▲ Rp 548 billion (2016)
- Net income: ▲ Rp 254 billion (2016)
- Total assets: ▲ Rp 2.377 trillion (2016)
- Total equity: ▲Rp 1.284 trillion (2016)
- Owners: Panin Bank (29%); Patria Nusa Adamas (30%)
- Number of employees: 240 (2016)
- Website: www.pans.co.id

PT. Panin Sekuritas Tbk is a financial services company specializing in stock brokerage based in Jakarta, Indonesia. It was awarded the "Best Securities Company" in 2006 and 2007 by Investor magazine; "Best Managed Companies" in 2010 by FinanceAsia. Panin Sekuritas is Panin Group's division for securities and mutual fund management.

== History ==
The company was founded in 1989 as the 'Panin Group' set up a private securities firm with the name PT. Panin Sekuritasindo. In 1991 the company opened to new investors and financial partners, and subsequently changed their name to PT. Nusamas Panin.

Healthy growth in Indonesia's financial sector prompted the company's name change to PT. Panin Sekuritas. This was also part of Panin Group's effort to standardize its company divisions naming convention.

In 2000, Panin Sekuritas became a publicly listed and traded company at Indonesia Stock Exchange after several years of consistent growth and profit. With this, the company was allowed by Indonesia's capital market and financial institution regulation body to append "Tbk." to its name to describe that it is a public company. Officially renamed to PT. Panin Sekuritas Tbk.

Panin Sekuritas headquarters in the Indonesia Stock Exchange building.

== Logo ==
There are two distinct company logos. The first is a blue three-leaf clover to describe its affiliation to Indonesia's financial Panin Group. The design of three-leaf illustrates the three financial divisions of Panin Group: banking, life insurance and securities. The second is the word "Panin Sekuritas" which describes that this is the securities company part of the group.
