= Metro Realty =

Indonesian retail company

Metro Supermarket
- Company type: Public
- Industry: Retail
- Founded: 1955
- Headquarters: Jakarta
- Products: Grocery, Real Estate
- Website: www.metrorealty.co.id

PT Metro Realty Tbk. (IDX: MTSM) is a company based in Jakarta, Indonesia; principal activities are real estate and property management.

Until March 2008, MTSM also ran a supermarket division, but this was closed down due to a decrease in custom and lower-than-expected profits.

The Group owns the properties Metro Pasar Baru Building, Melawai Plaza Building and Metro Sunter Plaza. The Group also developed a housing and apartment complex called Complex Metro Sunter located in Jalan Danau Sunter, Jakarta.

Stock is listed on the Indonesia Stock Exchange.

World Wildlife Foundation (WWF) publishes an annual scorecard of the palm oil policies of 59 companies. As of 2009, twelve companies including Metro, tied for worst, scoring 0. Sainsburys, Marks & Spencer and Migro achieved the highest scores.
