= Pabrik Kertas Indonesia =

Indonesian pulp and paper company

Coordinates: 7.234978°S 112.746022°E

PT Pabrik Kertas Indonesia (Pakerin)
- Type: Private
- Industry: Pulp and paper; inorganic chemicals
- Founded: 1977; 49 years ago in Mojokerto Regency, East Java
- Founder: Njoo Soegiharto
- Headquarters: Surabaya, Indonesia
- Key people: Njoo Soegiharto (President Commissioner; deceased); Tjeng Shinta Dewi (Commissioner; deceased); Njoo Henry Susilowidjojo (Commissioner); Njoo Steven Tirtowidjojo (Director); David Siemens Kurniawan (President Director); (Note: Officers recorded in the Ministry of Law's Legal Entity Administration System (SABH) under Deed No. 14 of 19 November 2018, as reported by the Directorate General of General Legal Administration in January 2026. The company's management has since been the subject of litigation; see § Management dispute.)
- Products: Kraftliner, corrugating medium, coated duplex board, chipboard, core board, caustic soda
- Subsidiaries: PT Paboxin
- Website: pakerin.co.id

PT Pabrik Kertas Indonesia (lit. 'Indonesian Paper Mill'; commonly known as Pakerin) is an Indonesian manufacturer of industrial packaging paper and inorganic chemicals. Its headquarters are in Surabaya, East Java, and its mill complex is in Bangun village, Pungging District, Mojokerto Regency. The company was established in 1977 and began commercial production in 1980.

Since 2020, the company's management has been the subject of litigation between Njoo Steven Tirtowidjojo, a son and heir of founder Njoo Soegiharto, together with Njoo Henry Susilowidjojo, and David Siemens Kurniawan. Paperboard production at the Mojokerto mill has been suspended since December 2024, while the caustic soda line was reported to be operating normally in June 2026.

== History ==
Pakerin was founded by Njoo Soegiharto and began commercial production in 1980 with an installed capacity of 15,000 tonnes a year. The company later expanded to a design capacity of 700,000 tonnes a year. According to the company, it pioneered the industrial use of bagasse, or sugarcane residue, for pulp production in Indonesia, and post-consumer recycled material now supplies more than 80 percent of its fibre requirements.

== Products and facilities ==
Pakerin's main products are packaging-grade industrial papers, namely kraftliner, corrugating medium, coated duplex board, chipboard and core board. It also produces inorganic chemicals, including caustic soda and hydrochloric acid. Its operations are vertically integrated, with in-house pulp, caustic soda, power and steam, and raw-water treatment units.

== Ownership and management ==
According to the Directorate General of General Legal Administration (Ditjen AHU) of the Ministry of Law, the most recent amendment to Pakerin's articles of association recorded as valid in the ministry's Legal Entity Administration System (SABH) is Deed No. 14 of 19 November 2018. That record lists 522 million shares, held by PT Inti Anugerah (339.2 million shares; 64.98 percent), PT Supreme Agung (176.4 million shares; 33.79 percent) and founder Njoo Soegiharto (6.4 million shares; 1.23 percent).

The same record lists Njoo Soegiharto as president commissioner, his son Njoo Steven Tirtowidjojo as director, Njoo Henry Susilowidjojo as commissioner and David Siemens Kurniawan as president director. In the administrative proceedings described below, Steven, as an heir of Soegiharto, stated that PT Inti Anugerah and PT Supreme Agung are each owned equally by PT Unilink Prima and PT Persatuan Perkasa, and that he holds 11.2 percent of the shares in each of those two companies.

== Management dispute ==
After Soegiharto's death in November 2019, a dispute arose over the management of Pakerin. Ditjen AHU has described it as a dispute involving the heirs of Soegiharto, Njoo Steven Tirtowidjojo and Njoo Henry Susilowidjojo, and David Siemens Kurniawan. Counsel for the management led by David has described the conflict as a family matter with two parties identified in reporting by the initials ST and HS.

== See also ==
- List of paper mills
