= Porong =

- District
- Location in Sidoarjo Regency
- Coordinates: 7.53966°S 112.685653°E
- Country: Indonesia
- Province: East Java
- Regency: Sidoarjo Regency

Government
  - Head of district: Murtadho

Area
  - Total: 29.82 km^{2} (11.51 sq mi)
- Elevation: 4 m (13 ft)

Population (mid 2023)
  - Total: 70,170
  - Density: 2,353/km^{2} (6,095/sq mi)
- Time zone: UTC+7 (Indonesia Western Time)
- Postal code: 61274
- Area code: (+62) 31
- Vehicle registration: W
- Website: porong.sidoarjokab.go.id

Porong is a district in Sidoarjo Regency, East Java, Indonesia. It has a population of 70,170 as of 2023. Located about 14 kilometres (8.7 mi) south of the regency seat. It is bordered by Krembung District to the west, Pasuruan Regency to the south, Jabon District to the east, and Tanggulangin District to the north. The eponymous Porong River flows at its south.

== Villages ==
Porong consists of 19 administrative villages, of which six are classed as urban kelurahan and thirteen as rural desa.

Urban kelurahan:

- Gedang
- Jatirejo
- Juwetkenongo
- Mindi
- Porong
- Siring

Rural desa:

- Candipari
- Glagahharum
- Kebakalan
- Kebonagung
- Kedungboto
- Kedungsolo
- Kesambi
- Lajuk
- Pamotan
- Pesawahan
- Plumbon
- Renokenongo
- Wunut
