= Maspion =

Indonesian multinational company

Coordinates: 7.237887°S 112.743396°E

Maspion Holdings Corporation
- Trade name: Maspion Group
- Formerly: UD Logam Djawa "old" PT Maspion (until 2022)
- Type: Public
- Industry: Conglomerate
- Founded: 1962; 64 years ago
- Founder: Alim Husin
- Headquarters: Surabaya, Indonesia
- Area served: Worldwide
- Key people: Alim Markus (president and CEO)
- Products: Electronics; Steel; Plastic; Melamine resin; PVC; Pipe
- Services: Financial services; Insurance
- Subsidiaries: Alumindo Light Metal Industry; Bank Maspion; Indal Aluminium Industry; Maspion Electronics
- Website: maspion.com

Maspion Holdings Corporation, also known as the Maspion Group or simply known as Maspion (stylized as MASPION), is a group of autonomous Indonesian conglomerate and multinational companies, based in Surabaya, East Java. It was founded by Alim Husin in 1962.

The company employs around 30,000 people (2016) and has 44 subsidiaries. It has production facilities spread across four industrial areas in Sidoarjo and Gresik, East Java, and one factory in Jakarta and West Java.

== History ==
Maspion was founded in 1962 from a small home industry that produced kitchen equipment, managed by Alim Husin and his partner Gunardi Go. The home business at that time was named UD Logam Djawa. Starting from this small business, the founder started a business that gradually developed into a big industry. Production is not only limited to aluminum kitchen equipment it has also expanded to manufacturing kitchen utensil from plastic. In 1970, Alim Husin's family business progressed so much that he designed a new name and logo under the name Jin Feng (top of gold), and changed the name of the company to MASPION, the Indonesian language short from Mengajak Anda Selalu Percaya Industri Olahan Nasional ("Inviting You to Always Trust the National Industry"). This is in line with the establishment of a company labeled Maspion since 1971. Three years later, the company began producing PVC pipes and accessories. With this type of business the company's production is increasingly diverse. Since 1975, Maspion has also begun to develop the home electrical appliances business as well as stainless steel kitchen utensils.

Maspion Group in expanding its business cooperates with top-class companies, including Samsung, Marubeni, Komatsu, Sumitomo Metals, Kawasaki Steel, Satachi, Seven Seas Chemicals, and Siam Cement. Besides selling domestically, Maspion products are also exported to the United States, Japan, Australia, Europe and the Middle East. Maspion's export value in 1995 reached US$ 100 million dollars. The company also has a representative office in Toronto, Canada.

In 2021, Maspion Group entered into a joint venture with DP World and Caisse de dépôt et placement du Québec (CDPQ) to develop an international container port and an integrated industrial and logistics park in Gresik, East Java. The project was announced with a planned investment of more than US$1 billion.

== Products and services ==
Current

- Maxim
- Maspion Electronics
- Tivoli
- Maspion Plastic
- Plasticwares
- Vanda Melamine
- Panda
- Maslon
- Aubecq
- Logam Jawa
- Ishizuka
- PVC
- Meglio
- Bank Maspion

Former

- Uchida (discontinued on 2021 or 2022)
- Doff (discontinued)

== Sponsorships ==
In 2022, Maspion Holdings became the official sponsor of the AFF Mitsubishi Electric Cup 2022 chosen by Mitsubishi Electric, along with Gree, Wuling, Mercedes-Benz, Tiger Brokers and Yanmar.
