= Phillip Securities Indonesia =

Indonesian financial services company

- Industry: Financial services
- Founded: 1989; 37 years ago
- Headquarters: Jakarta, Indonesia
- Website: www.phillip.co.id

Phillip Securities Indonesia is a financial services company based in Jakarta, Indonesia. It is listed as a member of Indonesia Stock Exchange (IDX — Code: KK).

== Profile ==
The company was officially registered as a member of Indonesia Stock Exchange in 1989. Located at the heart of business in Jakarta, based on IDX (Indonesia Stock Exchange) data release about broker financial report 2012, company equity is more than IDR170 Billion.

== Award ==
In 2012, Indonesian Investor Magazine puts company ranking on 4th in the category of securities firms with assets above IDR 500 billion - 1 trillion after Kresna Sekurindo Graha Tbk, MNC Securities, Reliance Securities Tbk and followed by UOB Kay Hian Securities, Valbury Securities, Lautandhana Securindo and Trimegah Securities Tbk. The award refers to a number of criteria. Among them, revenue growth, net income growth, NPM, ROA, and ROE.

== Research ==
Phillip Securities Indonesia provides equity and market research for its brokerage clients. Its research division's products include Daily Market Commentary, Company Focus, Afternoon Updates, Technical Recommendation, Regional Market Focus, Stock Screener, and Webinars.

Daily Market Commentaries are market reviews written in Indonesian and in English. This report includes corporate and economic news. The feature is opened to the public.

Company Focus reports are ratings on stocks covered by its research analysts. The reports contain analysts’ views of each covered stocks and their target fair values. The valuation method commonly found in these reports is the discounted cash flow method. This feature is only accessible to Phillip's clients.

Afternoon Updates are short reports about stock trading activity in the first session. This feature is opened to the public.

Technical Recommendations contain stock recommendations with technical analysis. This feature is only available for Phillip's clients.

Regional Market Focus contains compilations of market reviews and market news from various countries where Phillip Capital operates. This feature is only accessible to Phillip's clients.

Stock Screener feature contains financial ratio screening module. Parameters and ratios provided include stock price, market capitalization, net profit, earnings per share, price to earnings ratio, book value, price to book value, debt to equity ratio, return on assets, return on equity, and profit margins of firms listed on the Indonesia Stock Exchange. This feature is only accessible to Phillip's clients.

The Webinars contains presentation slides and YouTube video links of the webinars held by Phillip's equity analysts. The webinars are provided free to the public.
