= Sat Nusapersada =

Indonesian electronics manufacturer

PT Sat Nusapersada (Persero) Tbk.
- Company type: Public
- Traded as: IDX: PTSN
- ISIN: ID1000107808
- Industry: Electrical equipment
- Founded: 1 June 1990
- Founder: Abidin Fan Hasibuan
- Headquarters: Batam, Indonesia
- Key people: Abidin Fan Hasibuan, President Director
- Revenue: ▼US$141 million (2022)
- Operating income: ▲US$12.7 million (2022)
- Net income: ▲US$9.9 million (2022)
- Total assets: ▼US$147.6 million (2022)
- Total equity: ▲US$99.6 million (2022)
- Number of employees: 3,274 (2017)
- Website: http://www.satnusa.com

PT. Sat Nusapersada Tbk (IDX: PTSN), established in 1990, is located at Batam Island, Indonesia. Founded by Mr. Abidin (Chief Executive Officer), Sat Nusapersada began operation as a supplier of Printed Circuit Board (PCB) and mechanical part assembly for supply multinational industries located in Batam.

== Milestone ==
Starting with only 22 workers including himself, Sat Nusapersada slowly started to grow. From 1991 to 1994, Sat Nusapersada supplied not only PCB assembly, but started to assemble a semi-finished product and complete product. Big investments during that year were add 2 factories located at Jalan Pelita VI No. 99 Batam. SMT (Surface Mounting Technology) services was the new department established in 1996. Started with only a few SMT lines, now (2007) increased to 31 lines, with up to date hi-tech machinery.

== Certification and awards ==
Sat Nusapersada already certified ISO 9001:2000 and ISO 14001:2004, for Management and Environmental, by Bureau Veritas Certification. Beside that, also certified by Indonesian government for Safety and Healthy Management System (SMK3/OHSAS 18001).

== Customer ==
Sat Nusapersada customers are multinational companies, mostly from Japan and Taiwan.

== Latest news ==
In 17 years of manufacturing business, Sat Nusapersada decided to change from private company into public listed company. The initial public offering was held at the Shangri-la Hotel, Jakarta, on 5 September 2007, attended by more than 500 prospective investors. Based on a plan, Sat Nusapersada will be officially entering Jakarta Stock Exchange by 8 November 2007.

Official listing was attended by Mr. Abidin Fan Hasibuan(CEO PTSN [trading code at JSX), Mr. Erry (JSX Director), Mr. Fahmi Idris (Industrial Minister of Republic Indonesia), Mr. Ismeth Abdullah (Governor of Riau Archipelago Province), Mr. Sofyan Wanandi (Commissioner of PTSN and Chief of Apindo) Mr. Ahmad Dahlan (Mayor of Batam), etc. The debut at JSX was at Rp 580.00 and rose to Rp 660.00 in 13 minutes since entering the stock floor though it is now trading at a lower price.
