= Alumindo =

Indonesian metal manufacturing

Coordinates: 7.237887°S 112.743396°E

PT Alumindo Light Metal Industry Tbk
- Company type: Public
- Traded as: IDX: ALMI
- Industry: Metal manufacturing
- Founded: 26 June 1978; 48 years ago
- Headquarters: Surabaya, Indonesia
- Area served: Worldwide
- Key people: Alim Markus
- Products: Aluminium sheet; Aluminium circle; Aluminium embossed and roofing; Aluminium foil
- Revenue: ▲ Rp 3.48 trillion (2017)
- Net income: ▲ Rp 134 billion (2017)
- Total assets: ▲ Rp 2.38 trillion (2017)
- Total equity: ▼ Rp 379 billion (2017)
- Owner: Maspion
- Number of employees: 926 (2018)
- Website: Alumindo website

PT Alumindo Light Metal Industry Tbk, or also known simply as Alumindo, is the largest flat rolled aluminium manufacturer in South East Asia, and a publicly traded subsidiary of Maspion which was founded in 1978 and started to become a commercial company in 1983. The company is headquartered in Surabaya, East Java. Initially, each year the company was able to produce around 4,800 tons of aluminum sheet which is usually used as the main ingredient in the manufacture of household appliances, transportation equipment, as well as building materials. Alumindo also produces 12 thousand tons of tin sheet which is the main ingredient in the packaging industry.

== History ==
Alumindo was originally built on 26 June 1978 for procuring raw materials for the Maspion Group company which manufactures kitchen equipment and packaging industries in the Indonesian market. As market demand continues to grow, Alumnindo is able to adding production capacity which has now reached 144 thousand tons of aluminum and 15.6 thousand tons of tin. Alumindo mainly produces air cargo containers, cooking utensils, food wrappers and cigarettes, and bottle caps.

On 11 December 1996, ALMI obtained an effective statement from BAPEPAM-LK (now the Financial Services Authority - OJK) to conduct an initial public offering. These shares were listed on the Surabaya Stock Exchange and Jakarta Stock Exchange (now the Indonesia Stock Exchange) on 2 January 1997.

In 1998, Alumindo received a certificate from ISO 9002 from Lloyd's Register as a company that is recognized as having international standards in the production process. Alumindo also received the same award for the Exporter with Excellent Performance category as an appreciation for the performance of excellent exporters with management that complies with international standards based on The Aluminum Association.

== Products ==
- Aluminium sheet
- Aluminium circle
- Aluminium embossed and roofing
- Aluminium foil
