= Sidoarjo (town) =

Town and district in East Java, Indonesia

- Town and district
- Interactive map outlining Sidoarjo district
- Location in Java and Indonesia Sidoarjo (Indonesia)
- Coordinates: 7°26′46″S 112°43′4″E
- Country: Indonesia
- Province: East Java
- Regency: Sidoarjo Regency

Government
  - Camat: Gundari

Area
  - Total: 62.56 km^{2} (24.15 sq mi)

Population (mid-2023 estimate)
  - Total: 197,756
  - Density: 3,161/km^{2} (8,187/sq mi)

Sidoarjo is an administrative district (kecamatan) in Sidoarjo Regency and also a town within that regency (of which it is the seat), in the East Java province of Indonesia. In mid 2023, Sidoarjo district had a population of 197,756 and a density of 3,161 persons per km^{2}.

The town of Sidoarjo extends beyond the district boundaries to include much of neighbouring districts, particularly Candi and Buduran. In the 1990 census, it had an urban population of 586,602.

== Administrative divisions ==
Sidoarjo district is divided into 24 administrative divisions, comprising 14 urban villages (kelurahan, each identified in the table below by an asterisk after its name) and ten rural villages (desa). The table also includes the post codes of each village.

Kode Wilayah	Name of kelurahan or desa	Area in km^{2}	Pop'n census 2020	Pop'n estimate mid 2023	Post code
35.15.08.2001	Lebo	2.18	5,922	5,801	61223
35.15.08.2002	Suko	2.05	16,392	17,077	61224
35.15.08.2003	Banjarbendo	1.42	8,627	8,780	61225
35.15.08.1004	Sidokare *	1.14	16,231	15,612	61214
35.15.08.1005	Celep *	0.53	5,916	5,674	61215
35.15.08.1006	Sekardangan *	8.24	7,533	7,490	61215
35.15.08.1007	Gebang *	12.23	6,865	7,030	61231
35.15.08.2008	Rangkah Kidul	2.58	4,397	4,459	61234
35.15.08.1009	Bulusidokare *	9.70	8,606	8,292	61234
35.15.08.1010	Pucanganom *	4.04	6,181	6,012	61217
35.15.08.1011	Pekaumam *	0.09	2,723	2,518	61213
35.15.08.1012	Lemah Putro *	0.89	13,043	12,224	61213
35.15.08.1013	Sidokumpul *	0.66	6,333	6,018	61212
35.15.08.1014	Sidoklumpuk *	0.47	5,789	5,363	61218
35.15.08.2015	Bluru Kidul	2.95	18,443	18,498	61233
35.15.08.2016	Kemiri	3.23	7,391	7,517	61234
35.15.08.1017	Pucang *	0.86	6,064	5,891	61219
35.15.08.1018	Magersari *	1.14	14,454	13,949	61212
35.15.08.2019	Jati	1.42	10,167	10,105	61226
35.15.08.1020	Cemengkalang *	0.94	3,956	3,976	61234
35.15.08.2021	Cemengbakalan	1.10	4,176	4,343	61234
35.15.08.1022	Urangagung *	1.94	7,424	7,614	61234
35.15.08.2023	Sarirogo	1.53	5,119	5,223	61234
35.15.08.2024	Sumput	1.25	7,637	8,300	61228
	Totals	62.56	199,389	197,756	
