= Waru, Sidoarjo =

Waru
- District
- Location in Sidoarjo Regency
- Coordinates: 7.351143599999999°S 112.7688416°E
- Country: Indonesia
- Province: East Java
- Regency: Sidoarjo Regency

Government
  - Head of district: Fredik Suharto

Area
  - Total: 30.59 km^{2} (11.81 sq mi)
- Elevation: 5.00 m (16.40 ft)

Population (mid 2024 estimate)
  - Total: 195,761
  - Density: 6,400/km^{2} (16,570/sq mi)
- Time zone: UTC+7 (Indonesia Western Time)
- Postal code: 61256
- Area code: (+62) 31
- Vehicle registration: W
- Website: www.waru.sidoarjokab.go.id

Waru is an administrative district (kecamatan) in Sidoarjo Regency, in the East Java Province of Indonesia. It is situated immediately south of the city of Surabaya, of which it is a suburb. The Purabaya bus station is located in this district.

== Villages ==
Waru consists of 17 villages namely:

- Berbek
- Bungurasih
- Janti
- Kedungrejo
- Kepuhkiriman
- Kureksari
- Madaeng
- Ngingas
- Pepelegi
- Tambakoso
- Tambakrejo
- Tambaksawah
- Tambaksumur
- Tropodo
- Wadungasri
- Waru
- Wedoro
