= Sidoarjo Regency =

Regency in East Java, Indonesia

Sidoarjo Regency Kabupaten Sidoarjo
- Regency

Other transcription(s)
  - Javanese: Sidåarjå (Gêdrig) سيداهرجا (Pégon) ꦱꦶꦢꦲꦂꦗ (Hånåcåråkå)
  - Madurese: Siḍuwarjhâ (Latèn) سيڊووارجۤا (Pèghu) ꦯꦶꦝꦸꦮꦂꦗ (Carakan)
  - Chinese: 徐圖利祖 (Hànzì); Xútúlìzǔ (Pīnyīn); Sî-tô͘-lī-chó͘ (Pe̍h-ōe-jī)
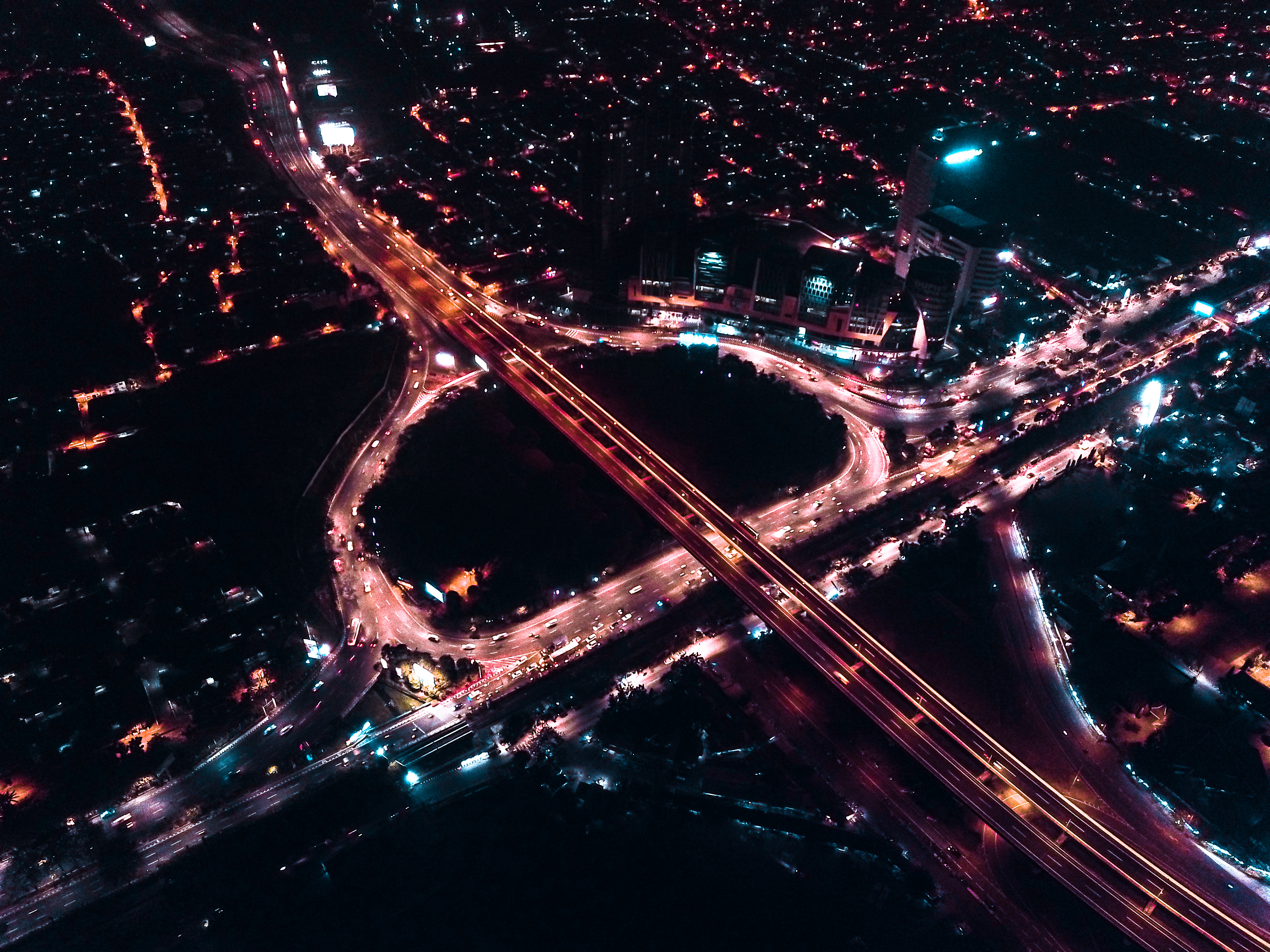
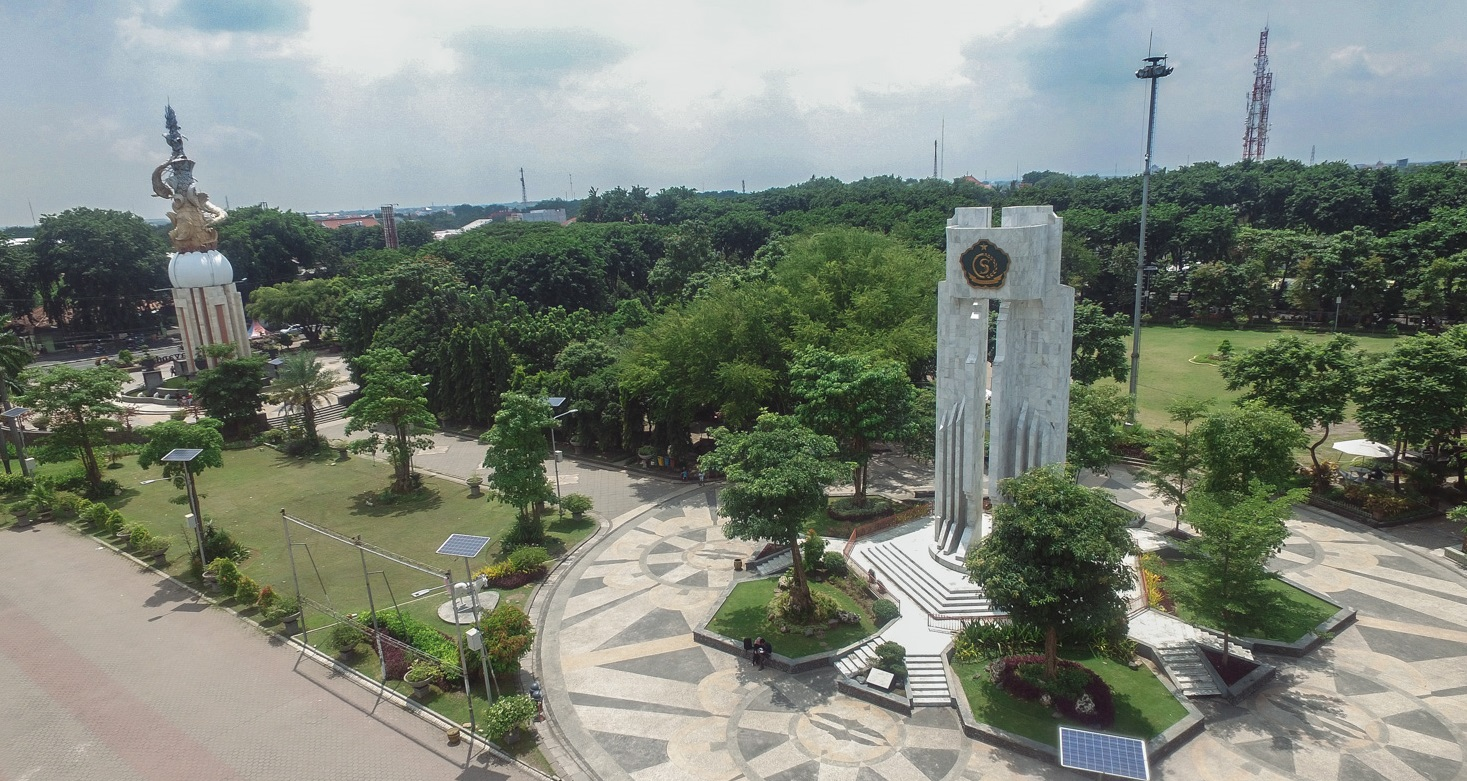
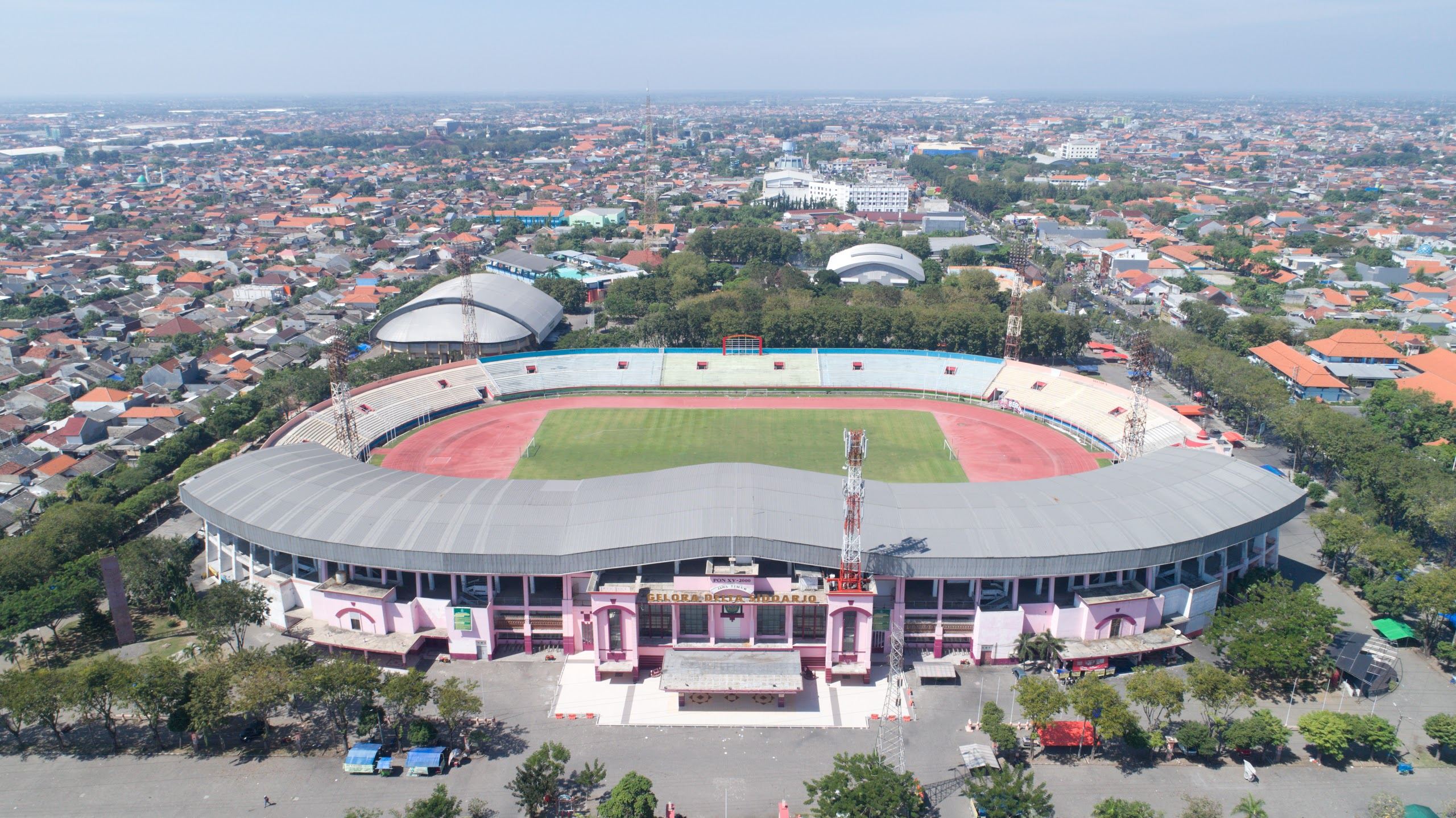
- Clockwise from top left: Waru interchange road, Alun-alun Sidoarjo, and Gelora Delta Stadium

- Seal
- Motto: Sidoarjo Bersih Hatinya "The clean-hearted Sidoarjo"
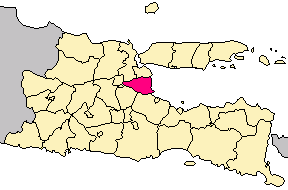
- Location within East Java
- Interactive map outlining Sidoarjo Regency
- Location in Java and Indonesia Sidoarjo Regency (Indonesia)
- Coordinates: 7°27′S 112°42′E
- Country: Indonesia
- Province: East Java
- Capital: Sidoarjo

Government
  - Regent: Subandi
  - Vice Regent: Mimik Idayana

Area
  - Total: 719.34 km^{2} (277.74 sq mi)

Population (mid 2025 estimate)
  - Total: 2,041,260
  - Density: 2,837.7/km^{2} (7,349.6/sq mi)
- Time zone: UTC+7 (IWST)
- Area code: (+62) 31
- Website: sidoarjokab.go.id

Sidoarjo Regency (Javanese: ꦑꦧꦸꦥꦠꦺꦤ꧀ꦱꦶꦢꦲꦂꦗ, romanized: Kabupatèn Sidaharja) is a regency in East Java, Indonesia. The regency has its capital in the Sidoarjo District and covers an area of approximately 719.34 km^{2}, making it the geographically smallest regency in the province. Nevertheless, Sidoarjo Regency is densely populated, with an estimated 2,041,260 residents as of mid 2025 (an average of about 2,837.7 people per km^{2}), comprising 1,022,052 males and 1,019,008 females. Its location south of Surabaya makes it an integral part of the Gerbangkertosusila metropolitan area, sharing borders with Surabaya, Gresik, Pasuruan, Mojokerto, and the Madura Strait.

Administratively, Sidoarjo Regency is divided into 18 districts, sub-divided into 28 urban villages (kelurahan) and 318 rural villages (desa). The most densely populated districts are located in the northern part, such as Waru and Taman directly adjoining the city of Surabaya, which serve as gateways to Surabaya and other centers of urbanization. Meanwhile, coastal areas like Sedati and Porong lie at low elevations (0–3 meters) and are characterized by shrimp and milkfish ponds — which is why Sidoarjo is nicknamed the "Delta City" and the "Shrimp City."

Sidoarjo Regency traces its roots deep into the layers of ancient Javanese history — the region was originally part of the Kahuripan kingdom founded by Airlangga around 1019, with the capital at the mouth of the Brantas River, before it was divided into two kingdoms, Janggala and Kediri, in 1045. As part of Janggala, its ancient capital was located in Hujung Galuh (now partly within Sidoarjo and Surabaya), which developed into a major port for the Majapahit Empire in the 14th century. Traces of this era are still visible in structures like Pari Temple (established around 1371 during the reign of Hayam Wuruk) and Dermo Temple (believed to date from the mid-14th century), which showcase the distinctive red-brick architecture of Majapahit and stand as symbols of a glorious past.

Sidoarjo Regency plays an increasingly important economic role as a major satellite city of Surabaya, marked by the presence of Juanda International Airport in Sedati — one of the busiest air gateways in Indonesia, handling around 14 million passengers annually, making it the third-busiest airport in the country. The area's accessibility is enhanced by dedicated toll roads such as the Waru–Juanda Toll Road, which directly connects to the airport, as well as the Surabaya–Gempol Toll Road, which facilitates southbound distribution and improves the mobility of goods and people. In Sidoarjo's urban center, the economic vibrancy is reflected in the numerous modern shopping centers: Lippo Plaza, Ciplaz Sidoarjo, Transmart Carrefour, and the Suncity Superblock.

Sidoarjo Regency ranks highly in the Human Development Index (HDI) category in both East Java and Indonesia. In 2024, Sidoarjo's HDI reached 82.31, placing it fourth in East Java after the cities of Malang, Surabaya, and Madiun, and categorizing it as "very high."

== Administrative districts ==
Administration of Sidoarjo Regency

The Sidoarjo Regency is divided into 18 administrative districts (kecamatan). The districts are tabulated below with their areas and their populations at the 2010 census and the 2020 census, together with the official estimates as of mid 2025. The table also includes the locations of the district administrative centres, the number of administrative villages in each district (totaling 322 rural desa and 31 urban kelurahan), and its post code.

Kode Wilayah	Name of District (kecamatan)	Area in km^{2}	Pop'n census 2010	Pop'n census 2020	Pop'n estimate mid 2025	Admin centre	No. of villages	Post code
35.15.01	Tarik	39.73	61,032	69,189	68,246	Mergosari	20	61265
35.15.02	Prambon	29.89	68,576	79,952	80,069	Prambon	20	61264
35.15.03	Krembung	27.90	58,336	69,887	69,473	Mojoruntul	19	61275
35.15.04	Porong	30.71	64,390	73,446	70,826	Juwetkenongo	19 ^{(a)}	61274
35.15.05	Jabon ^{(b)}	82.92	49,567	56,266	56,082	Dukuhsari	15	61276
35.15.06	Tanggulangin	29.78	83,304	89,804	88,827	Kalitengah	19	61272
35.15.07	Candi	42.86	145,155	153,423	159,090	Gelam	24	61271
35.15.09	Tulangan	31.31	84,582	102,339	103,614	Kenongo	22	61273
35.15.10	Wonoayu	30.29	71,822	85,586	86,128	Wonoayu	23	61261
35.15.14	Sukodono	32.85	110,596	121,859	126,822	Anggaswangi	19	61216: 61258
35.15.08	Sidoarjo	62.03	193,469	201,120	201,241	Sidokumpul	24 ^{(c)}	61212: 61234
35.15.15	Buduran	43.65	91,931	98,710	102,212	Banjarkemantren	15	61252
35.15.17	Sedati	79.23	92,786	96,636	98,580	Pulungan	16	61253
35.15.18	Waru	30.59	231,309	200,754	196,356	Janti	17	61256
35.15.16	Gedangan	24.01	132,971	120,003	120,768	Keboansikep	15	61254
35.15.13	Taman	31.36	213,224	207,815	204,244	Bebekan	24 ^{(d)}	61212: 61257
35.15.11	Krian	25.89	131,281	130,930	133,926	Kraton	22 ^{(e)}	61262
35.15.12	Balongbendo	44.34	66,841	76,050	74,756	Wonokupang	20	61263
	Totals	719.34	2,191,489	2,033,764	2,041,260	Sidoarjo	353	

Notes: (a) comprising six kelurahan (Gedang, Jatirejo, Juwetkenongo, Mindi, Porong and Siring) and thirteen desa. (b) including the two small offshore islands of Pulau Dem and Pulau Kedung.
(c) comprising fourteen kelurahan (Bulusidokare, Celep, Cemengkalang, Gebang, Lemahputro, Magersari, Pekauman, Pucang, Pucanganom, Sekardangan, Sidokare, Sidoklumpuk, Sidokumpul and Urangagung) and ten desa.
(d) comprising eight kelurahan (Bebekan, Geluran, Kalijaten, Ketegan, Ngelom, Sepanjang, Taman and Wonocolo) and sixteen desa.
(e) including three kelurahan (Kemasan, Krian and Tambak Kemerakan).

== Economy ==
As a satellite region and part of Greater Surabaya, the Sidoarjo economy is valued at 197.24 Trillion IDR in 2020 and is the second-largest in East Java after Surabaya.

Primary Sector

Although Sidoarjo Regency's land area is relatively small and densely populated, the primary sector still maintains a role in Sidoarjo's economy. Agriculture is mainly produced in the western and southwestern parts of Sidoarjo Tulangan District, Krembung District, and Balongbendo District. During the colonial era, Sidoarjo was famous for sugarcane production and it hosted several sugar mills owned by the Colonial government. After Independence, the Indonesian government nationalised all sugar mills in Sidoarjo. The sugarcane production sector peaked in the 70s and gradually declined since then, due to inflows of manufacturing investment and rapid urbanization that reduced the sugarcane planting area. Rice, banana, papaya, cassava, and several lowland vegetables are still popular crops.

Fisheries also still maintain a role. In the past, Sidoarjo was known as a fishing town, but the fishing sector was slowly declining as Sidoarjo became more urbanized. Fishing has been replaced by aquaculture as the main source of fish in Sidoarjo. Highly productive aquaculture is mainly produced in the eastern part of Sidoarjo Regency, and the main product is Milkfish and farmed shrimp which are mostly exported to the US and Japan. Sidoarjo is also famous for its processed fishery products, such as prawn cracker, fish cracker, shrimp paste and petis.

The mining sector could be neglected as it contributes very little to Sidoarjo economy. The main mining sector is natural gas, which is produced in Porong District. There are also several sand miners that operate in Jabon District.

Secondary Sector

Manufacturing is a main sector of the Sidoarjo economy with a contribution of nearly 40%. Sidoarjo manufacturing production is diversified and ranges from furniture to electronics products. There are numerous manufacturing plants in Sidoarjo. Among this are : Jatim Taman Steel (Steel Manufacturer), Avian (Paints and building material), Tunggal Djaja (Paints Production), Maspion (Household durable goods), Japfa Comfeed (Feedmills and poultry), Interbat (Pharmaceuticals), Integra (Furniture), Tjiwi Kimia (Paper), Kimberly-Clark's Softex (Non-durable consumer goods), Unicharm (Non-durable consumer goods), Polygon Bikes (Bikes), Alumindo (Aluminium products), Sekar Group (Food processing), Hisamitsu (Pharmaceutical), Lighting Solutions (Lamp), ECCO (Footwear), Samator (Industrial gas and chemicals), Bernofarm (Pharmaceutical), Muntjul Diamond (Vehicle body), Charoen Pokphand (Agribusiness) and many more.

There are thousands of small and medium manufacturers established in Sidoarjo. Garments, Food Processing, Footwear, Apparel, and Furniture are products that are usually produced by small and medium manufacturers in Sidoarjo. Many small and medium manufacturers produce traditional herbs, machinery, packaging, and metal products.

During the colonial era, there were 10 sugarmills in Sidoarjo and the oldest is Watu Tulis Sugarmills that built in 1838. There remain three sugarmills in Sidoarjo. Among this are New Candi Sugarmills that built in 1911, Krembung Sugarmills, and Watu Tulis Sugarmills.

Tertiary Sector

The main tertiary sectors in Sidoarjo are wholesaling and retailing, food services, education, and financial services. As Sidoarjo is getting more urbanized, the tertiary sector is predicted to grow significantly. The fastest growth in the tertiary sector is recording in experience-related services, such as food services (notably restaurant, cafe) and movie theater. Education Services are also predicted to grow, as several private tutoring companies are opening a branch in Sidoarjo and private schools are gaining more students, due to increasingly population, income, and lack of capacity in state schools.

== Lapindo Mud flow ==
Since May 2006, more than 10,000 people in the Porong District have been displaced by hot mud flowing from a natural gas well being drilled by Lapindo Brantas, an oil well company that is part of a conglomerate owned by Coordinating Minister for the People's Welfare Aburizal Bakrie. Gas and hot mud started spewing from the well on May 28, when the drill penetrated a layer of liquid sediment. Attempts to pump concrete down the well did not stop the flow. While some scientists have speculated that the earthquake that struck Yogyakarta on May 27, the day before the well erupted, may have cracked the ground, creating potential pathways for the mud to reach the surface, others have suggested that the drilling procedure was faulty by not using a casing. This is likely to be incorrect as technical papers on the subject showed that there were up to four sets of casing installed and cemented in the well. Some 50,000 cubic metres of hot mud were erupting every day as of August; in September, the amount increased to some 125,000 cubic metres daily. On September 26 barriers built to hold back the mud failed, resulting in the flooding of more villages. Gus Maksum, one of the thousands of Sidoarjo villagers displaced by the mud flow gives a detailed first-hand account of the first year of the disaster in his memoir Titanic Made By Lapindo. As of late September 2006 scientists said that a mud volcano may have been forming, and could be impossible to stop.

== Climate ==
Sidoarjo has a tropical savanna climate (Köppen Aw) with moderate to little rainfall from May to November and heavy rainfall from December to April.

Climate data for Sidoarjo
Month	Jan	Feb	Mar	Apr	May	Jun	Jul	Aug	Sep	Oct	Nov	Dec	Year
Mean daily maximum °C (°F)	30.8 (87.4)	30.9 (87.6)	31.1 (88.0)	31.5 (88.7)	31.6 (88.9)	31.6 (88.9)	31.4 (88.5)	31.9 (89.4)	32.5 (90.5)	32.9 (91.2)	32.6 (90.7)	31.5 (88.7)	31.7 (89.0)
Daily mean °C (°F)	26.7 (80.1)	26.8 (80.2)	26.8 (80.2)	27.1 (80.8)	26.8 (80.2)	26.4 (79.5)	26.0 (78.8)	26.2 (79.2)	26.9 (80.4)	27.5 (81.5)	27.6 (81.7)	27.0 (80.6)	26.8 (80.3)
Mean daily minimum °C (°F)	22.7 (72.9)	22.7 (72.9)	22.6 (72.7)	22.7 (72.9)	22.1 (71.8)	21.3 (70.3)	20.6 (69.1)	20.6 (69.1)	21.3 (70.3)	22.2 (72.0)	22.7 (72.9)	22.6 (72.7)	22.0 (71.6)
Average rainfall mm (inches)	303 (11.9)	296 (11.7)	268 (10.6)	174 (6.9)	116 (4.6)	66 (2.6)	40 (1.6)	10 (0.4)	7 (0.3)	30 (1.2)	110 (4.3)	232 (9.1)	1,652 (65.2)
Source: Climate-Data.org
