= List of banks in Indonesia =

This is a list of major banks in Indonesia.

== Top 10 banks ranked by total assets ==
As of 2024:

1. Bank Mandiri
2. Bank Rakyat Indonesia (BRI)
3. Bank Central Asia (BCA)
4. Bank Negara Indonesia (BNI)
5. Bank Tabungan Negara (BTN)
6. Bank Syariah Indonesia (BSI)
7. Bank CIMB Niaga
8. Bank OCBC Indonesia
9. Permata Bank
10. Bank Danamon

== Central Bank ==
- Bank Indonesia

== Conventional banks ==
=== Government-owned banks ===
==== State-owned ====
Name of bank	Founded	Majority owner	Notes
State-owned banks
Bank Mandiri	2 October 1998	Government of Indonesia	Foreign exchange bank
Bank Negara Indonesia (BNI)	5 July 1946	Government of Indonesia	Foreign exchange bank
Bank Rakyat Indonesia (BRI)	16 December 1895	Government of Indonesia	Foreign exchange bank
Bank Tabungan Negara (BTN)	16 October 1897	Government of Indonesia	Foreign exchange bank
Subsidiaries of state-owned banks
Bank Mandiri Taspen	23 February 1970	Bank Mandiri, PT Taspen	Non-foreign exchange bank
Hibank	25 February 1993	Bank Negara Indonesia	Foreign exchange bank
Bank Raya Indonesia	27 September 1989	Bank Rakyat Indonesia	Foreign exchange bank

==== Regional-owned banks ====
Regional-owned banks are formally instituted as Bank Pembangunan Daerah (Regional Development Bank, abbreviated as BPD).

Name of Bank	Founded	Majority Owner	Notes
Bank BPD Bali	5 July 1962	Bali Government	Foreign exchange bank
Bank BPD DIY	15 December 1961	Special Region of Yogyakarta Government	Non-foreign exchange bank
Bank Banten	11 September 1992	Banten Government	Non-foreign exchange bank
Bank Bengkulu	9 August 1969	Bengkulu Government	Non-foreign exchange bank
Bank BJB	20 May 1961	West Java Government	Foreign exchange bank
Bank BSG	17 March 1961	Gorontalo and North Sulawesi Government	Non-foreign exchange bank
Bank Jakarta	11 April 1961	Jakarta Government	Foreign exchange bank
Bank Jambi	12 February 1959	Jambi Government	Non-foreign exchange bank
Bank Jateng	13 March 1963	Central Java Government	Foreign exchange bank
Bank Jatim	17 August 1961	East Java Government	Foreign exchange bank
Bank Kalbar	28 November 1963	West Kalimantan Government	Non-foreign exchange bank
Bank Kalsel	25 March 1964	South Kalimantan Government	Non-foreign exchange bank
Bank Kalteng	28 October 1961	Central Kalimantan Government	Non-foreign exchange bank
Bankaltimtara	14 October 1965	East Kalimantan and North Kalimantan Government	Foreign exchange bank
Bank Lampung	1 August 1964	Lampung Government	Non-foreign exchange bank
Bank Maluku Malut	25 October 1961	Maluku and North Maluku Government	Non-foreign exchange bank
Bank Nagari	12 March 1962	West Sumatra Government	Foreign exchange bank
Bank NTT	17 July 1962	East Nusa Tenggara Government	Foreign exchange bank
Bank Papua	13 April 1966	Papua and West Papua Government	Non-foreign exchange bank
Bank Sulselbar	13 January 1961	South Sulawesi and West Sulawesi Government	Foreign exchange bank
Bank Sulteng	1 April 1969	Central Sulawesi Government	Non-foreign exchange bank
Bank Sultra	2 March 1968	Southeast Sulawesi Government	Non-foreign exchange bank
Bank Sumsel Babel	6 November 1957	South Sumatra and Bangka Belitung Islands Government	Foreign exchange bank
Bank Sumut	4 November 1961	North Sumatra Government	Foreign exchange bank

=== Private banks ===
Name of Bank	Founded	Majority Owner	Capital	Notes
Foreign exchange banks
Bank ANZ Indonesia	5 September 1990	ANZ Bank	(Australia)	
Bank Artha Graha Internasional	7 September 1973	Artha Graha Network	(Indonesia)	
Bank BNP Paribas Indonesia	10 November 1989	BNP Paribas	(France)	
Bank Bumi Arta	3 March 1967	Ajaib Group	(Indonesia)	
Bank Capital Indonesia	20 April 1989	PT Capital Financial Indonesia	(Indonesia)	
Bank Central Asia	21 February 1957	Djarum Group	(Indonesia)	
China Construction Bank Indonesia	2 April 1974	China Construction Bank	(China)	
Bank CIMB Niaga	26 September 1955	CIMB Group	(Malaysia)	
Bank CTBC Indonesia	21 July 1995	CTBC Financial Holding	(Taiwan)	
Bank Danamon	16 July 1956	MUFG	(Japan)	
Bank DBS Indonesia	30 June 1989	DBS Bank	(Singapore)	
Bank Ganesha	15 May 1990	PT Equity Development Investment	(Indonesia)	
Bank Hana Indonesia	27 April 1971	Hana Financial Group	(South Korea)	
Bank HSBC Indonesia	15 May 1989	HSBC	(United Kingdom)	
Bank IBK Indonesia	13 November 1973	Industrial Bank of Korea	(South Korea)	
Bank ICBC Indonesia	15 May 1970	ICBC	(China)	
Bank Ina Perdana	9 February 1990	Salim Group	(Indonesia)	
Bank Index Selindo	30 July 1992	PT Kazanah Indexindo	(Indonesia)	
J Trust Bank	30 May 1989	J Trust	(Japan)	
KB Bank	10 July 1970	KB Financial Group	(South Korea)	
Bank Maspion	6 November 1989	Kasikornbank	(Thailand)	Based in Surabaya
Bank Mayapada Internasional	7 September 1989	Mayapada Group	(Indonesia)	
Bank Maybank Indonesia	15 May 1959	Maybank	(Malaysia)	
Bank Mega	15 April 1969	Mega Corp	(Indonesia)	
Bank Mestika Dharma	27 April 1955	PT Mestika Buana Mas	(Indonesia)	Based in Medan
Bank Mizuho Indonesia	23 February 1989	Mizuho Financial Group	(Japan)	
Bank MNC Internasional	12 January 1990	MNC Financial Services	(Indonesia)	
Bank Multiarta Sentosa	28 July 1992	Wings Group	(Indonesia)	
Nobu Bank	16 August 1990	Lippo Group	(Indonesia)	
Bank OCBC Indonesia	4 April 1941	OCBC Bank	(Singapore)	
Bank of India Indonesia	28 September 1968	Bank of India	(India)	
Panin Bank	17 August 1971	Panin Financial	(Indonesia)	
Permata Bank	17 December 1954	Bangkok Bank	(Thailand)	
Bank QNB Indonesia	28 April 1913	QNB Group	(Qatar)	
Bank Resona Perdania	31 December 1953	Resona Holdings	(Japan)	
Bank SBI Indonesia	21 October 1970	State Bank of India	(India)	
Bank Shinhan Indonesia	8 September 1967	Shinhan Financial Group	(South Korea)	
Bank Sinarmas	18 August 1989	Sinar Mas	(Indonesia)	
Bank SMBC Indonesia	5 February 1958	SMBC Group	(Japan)	
Bank UOB Indonesia	31 August 1956	United Overseas Bank	(Singapore)	
Bank Victoria Internasional	28 October 1992	PT Victoria Investama	(Indonesia)	
Bank Woori Saudara	18 April 1906	Woori Financial Group	(South Korea)	
Non-foreign exchange banks
Allo Bank	21 October 1992	Mega Corp	(Indonesia)	
Amar Bank	15 March 1991	Tolaram Group	(Singapore)	
Bank Digital BCA	25 October 1965	Bank Central Asia	(Indonesia)	
Bank Jago	1 May 1992	PT Metamorfosis Ekosistem Indonesia, GoTo Financial, and Northstar Group	(Indonesia)	
Krom Bank	16 March 1957	Kredivo	(Singapore)	
Bank Neo Commerce	19 September 1989	Akulaku	(Indonesia)	
Bank Oke Indonesia	15 August 1990	Rush & Cash	(South Korea)	
Bank Sahabat Sampoerna	27 September 1990	Sampoerna Strategic and Xendit	(Indonesia)	
Bank Saqu	23 March 1971	WeLab and Astra International	(Hong Kong)	
Seabank	4 October 1991	Sea Ltd	(Singapore)	
Superbank	5 March 1993	Emtek, Grab, Singtel, and KakaoBank	(Indonesia)	

=== Foreign banks ===
Name of Bank	Incorporated in Indonesia
Bank of America	25 June 1968
Bank of China	13 January 2003
Citibank	14 June 1968
Deutsche Bank	18 March 1969
JPMorgan Chase Bank	17 June 1968
MUFG Bank	24 August 1968
Standard Chartered	1 October 1968

== Islamic Banks ==
=== Sharia bank ===
==== Government-owned sharia banks ====
Name of Bank	Founded	Majority Owner	Notes
Bank Syariah Indonesia	3 July 1969	Government of Indonesia	Foreign exchange bank
Bank Syariah Nasional	15 April 1966	Bank Tabungan Negara	Foreign exchange bank
Regional sharia banks
Bank Aceh Syariah	7 September 1957	Aceh Government	Non-foreign exchange bank
Bank BJB Syariah	15 January 2010	Bank BJB	Non-foreign exchange bank
Bank BRK Syariah	15 August 1961	Riau dan Riau Islands Government	Foreign exchange bank
Bank NTB Syariah	5 July 1964	West Nusa Tenggara Government	Non-foreign exchange bank

==== Private sharia banks ====
Name of Bank	Founded	Majority Owner	Notes
Bank Aladin Syariah	16 September 1994	Aladin Global Ventures	Foreign exchange bank
Bank BCA Syariah	21 May 1991	Bank Central Asia	Non-foreign exchange bank
Bank BTPN Syariah	7 March 1991	Bank SMBC Indonesia	Non-foreign exchange bank
KB Bank Syariah	24 December 1971	KB Bank	Non-foreign exchange bank
Bank Mega Syariah	14 July 1990	Bank Mega	Foreign exchange bank
Bank Muamalat Indonesia	1 November 1991	Hajj Fund Management Agency	Foreign exchange bank
Bank Nano Syariah	2 January 2024	Bank Sinarmas	Non-foreign exchange bank
Panin Dubai Syariah Bank	8 January 1972	Panin Bank and Dubai Islamic Bank	Foreign exchange bank

=== Islamic banking unit of conventional banks ===
Name	Founded
Regional-owned banks
Bank BPD DIY Syariah	19 February 2007
Bank Jakarta Syariah	8 March 2004
Bank Jambi Syariah	December 2011
Bank Jateng Syariah	26 April 2008
Bank Jatim Syariah	21 August 2007
Bank Kalbar Syariah	12 December 2005
Bank Kalsel Syariah	13 August 2004
Bankaltimtara Syariah	27 December 2006
Bank Nagari Syariah	28 September 2006
Bank Sulselbar Syariah	28 April 2007
Bank Sumsel Babel Syariah	2 January 2006
Bank Sumut Syariah	4 November 2004
Private banks
Bank CIMB Niaga Syariah	27 September 2004
Bank Danamon Syariah	14 May 2002
Bank Jago Syariah	23 September 2021
Bank Maybank Syariah Indonesia	20 May 2003
Bank OCBC Syariah Indonesia	12 October 2009
Permata Bank Syariah	10 November 2004

== Multilateral banks and financial institutions ==
- World Bank
- International Monetary Fund
- Asian Development Bank

== Representative offices in Jakarta ==
Australia

- National Australia Bank
- Westpac Banking Corporation

Belgium

- Fortis Bank

France

- BNP Paribas
- Caylon Corp and Inv Bank
- Natixis
- Banque Societe Generale Indonesia

Germany

- LBBW (Landesbank Baden-Wuerttemberg)
- Dresdner Bank AG
- Commerzbank AG

India

- ICICI Bank
- Bank of India
- State Bank of India

Japan

- Japan Bank for International Cooperation
- The Sumitomo Trust & Banking Co. Ltd

Netherlands

- ING Bank NV
- NV De Indonesische Overzeese Bank

Singapore

- OCBC Bank
- United Overseas Bank

Switzerland

- EFG Bank
- UBS AG Jakarta Representative Office

Taiwan

- The Exim Bank of Republic of China

United States

- Bank of New York
- Wachovia Bank N.A.

== See also ==
- ATM Bersama
- Economy of Indonesia
