= Financial Services Authority (Indonesia) =

Indonesian financial services authority

- Otoritas Jasa Keuangan
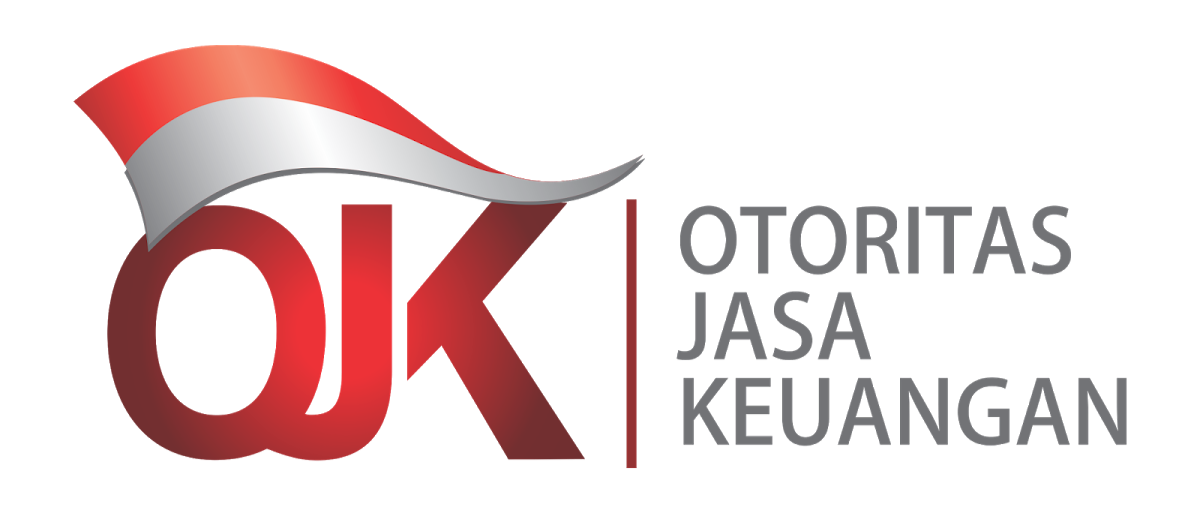
- Logo of OJK in Indonesian

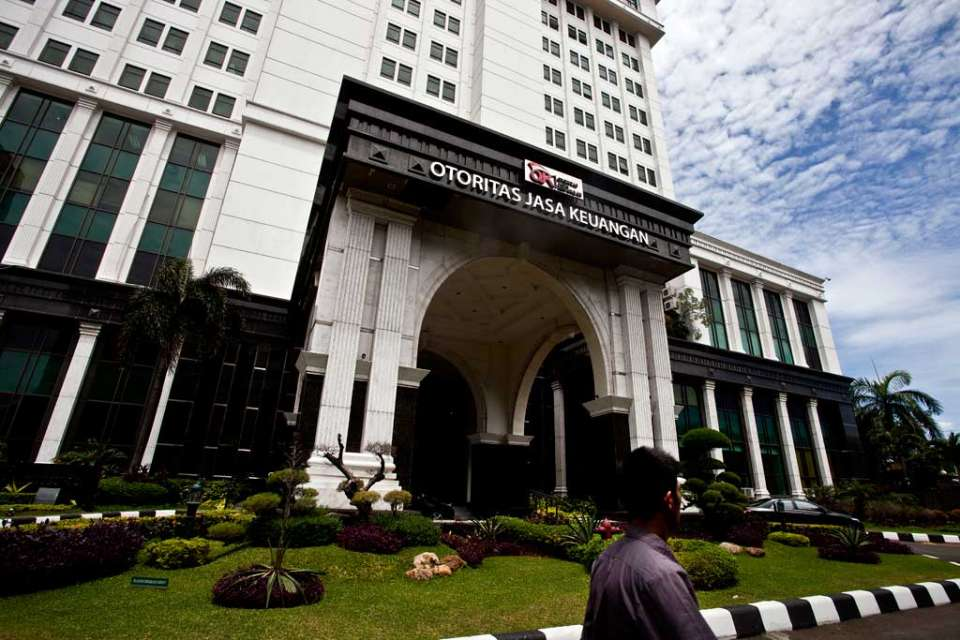
- Soemitro Djojohadikusumo Building, OJK headquarters in Jakarta named after Indonesia's former finance minister

Agency overview
- Formed: 2011
- Preceding agency: Badan Pengawas Pasar Modal dan Lembaga Keuangan (Bapepam-LK)
- Jurisdiction: Government of Indonesia
- Headquarters: Jakarta, Indonesia
- Agency executive: Friderica Widyasari Dewi, Chairman
- Website: www.ojk.go.id

Financial Services Authority (Indonesian: Otoritas Jasa Keuangan; OJK) is an Indonesian government agency which regulates and supervises the financial services sector. Its head office is in Jakarta.

After Law on Financial Sector Development and Strengthening was passed, the Indonesian government gave the authority a special status and made it part of the country's law enforcement system.

== History ==
The agency was created in 2011 under the Law No. 21 of 2011 as an independent institution responsible for regulating and supervising Indonesia's financial sector. It was created to replace the financial oversight functions previously held by Bank Indonesia (BI) and the Capital Market and Financial Institutions Supervisory Agency (Bapepam-LK), ensuring a more integrated and comprehensive supervision of banking, capital markets, and non-bank financial institutions. OJK officially began operations on 31 December 2012, taking over capital market and non-bank financial supervision from Bapepam-LK, and later, on 1 January 2014, assuming banking regulatory duties from BI. In response to financial sector challenges, the Indonesian government strengthened OJK's authority through the Financial Sector Development and Strengthening Law (UU P2SK), passed in 2023, granting it broader powers to enhance financial stability, consumer protection, and law enforcement coordination.

On 30 January 2026 Mahendra Siregar resigned as OJK chair together with two other senior OJK officials, explaining their departures as a "form of moral responsibility to support the creation of the necessary recovery steps" following a large drop in stock prices on the Indonesia Stock Exchange, whose CEO resigned on the same day.

== Member banks ==
All member banks are registered and supervised by the organization, and are required to carry the statement indicating such in advertising.

- Bank Mandiri
- Bank Central Asia
- Bank Negara Indonesia
- KB Bank (formerly Bank Bukopin and KB Bukopin)
- Bank Rakyat Indonesia
- Bank Permata
- Bank Mega
- Bank Nobu
- Bank Danamon
- OCBC Indonesia (formerly Bank OCBC NISP)
- Bank CIMB Niaga
- Bank SMBC Indonesia (formerly BTPN/Bank Tabungan Pensiunan Nasional)
- Bank Maybank Indonesia (formerly Bank Internasional Indonesia)
- Bank Tabungan Negara

=== Islamic banks ===
- Bank Syariah Indonesia
- Bank BCA Syariah
- Bank Muamalat
- Bank Mega Syariah
- Bank Panin Syariah
- Bank Syariah Bukopin

== See also ==
- Securities Commission
- Economy of Indonesia
- List of financial supervisory authorities by country
