= Zepp =

Group of Japanese music halls

The Zepp music halls are a group of Japanese music venues covering every area of the country. They play host to many international tours and are a popular stop among Japanese musicians. Each venue takes the Zepp name, along with the city in which it is located. The Zepp company is a subsidiary of Sony Music Entertainment Japan. Starting from 2017, Zepp locations also opened in other countries like Singapore (formerly), Taiwan, and Malaysia.

== Locations ==
=== Current ===
Name	Location	Opened	Capacity	
Name	Location	Opened	General Admission	Reserved
Zepp Sapporo	(Hokkaido) Sapporo	12 April 1998	2,009	723
Zepp Nagoya	(Aichi Prefecture) Nagoya	11 March 2005	1,864	741
Zepp Namba	(Osaka Prefecture) Osaka	27 April 2012	2,513	1,206
Zepp DiverCity	Tokyo	29 April 2012	2,473	1,102
Zepp Osaka Bayside	Osaka	17 February 2017	2,801	1,198
Zepp Fukuoka	(Fukuoka Prefecture) Fukuoka	7 December 2018	1,526	669
KT Zepp Yokohama	(Kanagawa Prefecture) Yokohama	7 March 2020	2,146	1,251
Zepp Haneda	Tokyo	18 July 2020	2,925	1,207
Zepp New Taipei	(Taiwan) New Taipei City	31 July 2020	2,245	1,025
Zepp Kuala Lumpur	(Malaysia) Kuala Lumpur	26 May 2022	2,414	1,148
Zepp Shinjuku	Tokyo	17 April 2023	1,500	693

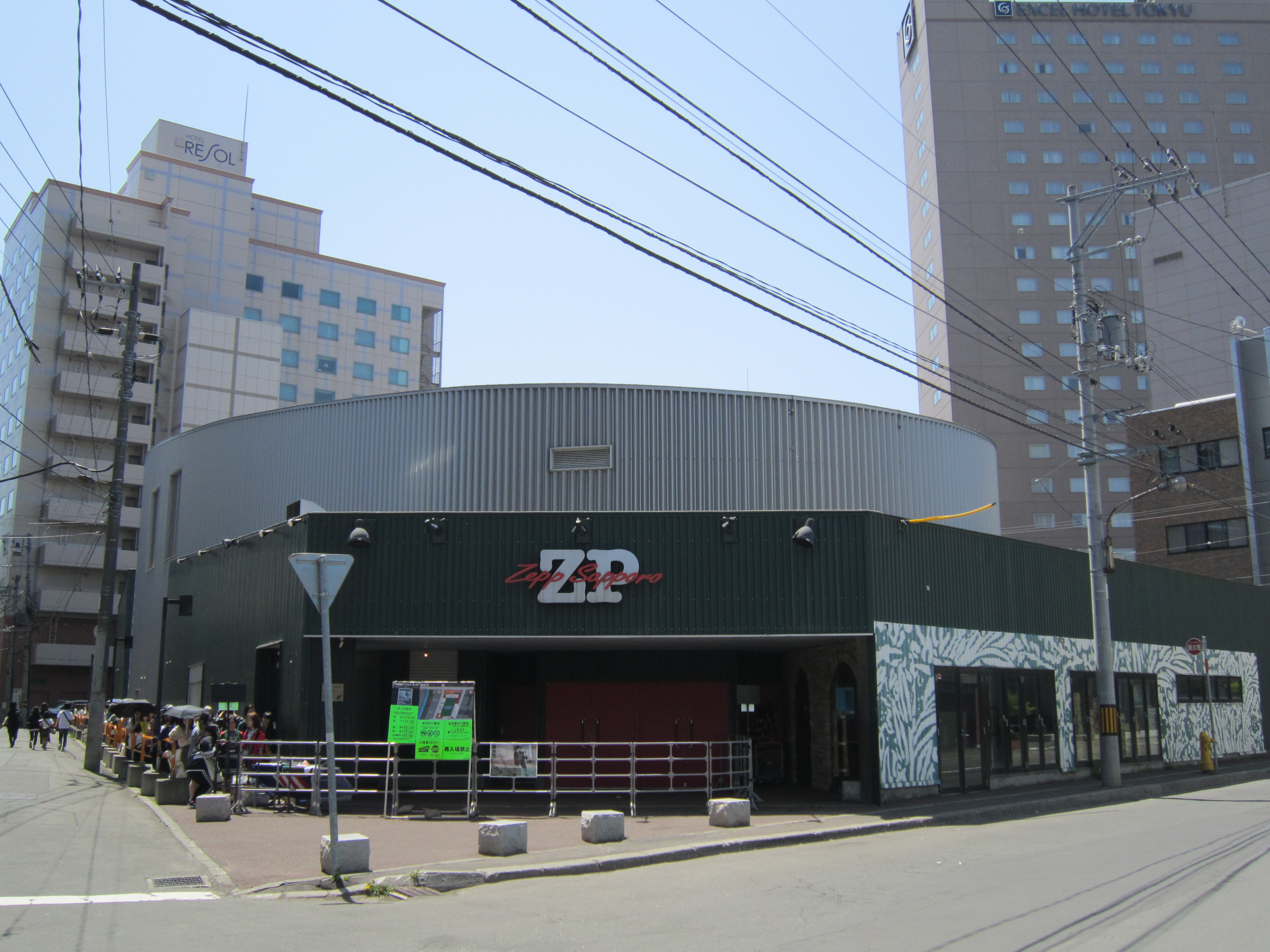
Zepp Sapporo

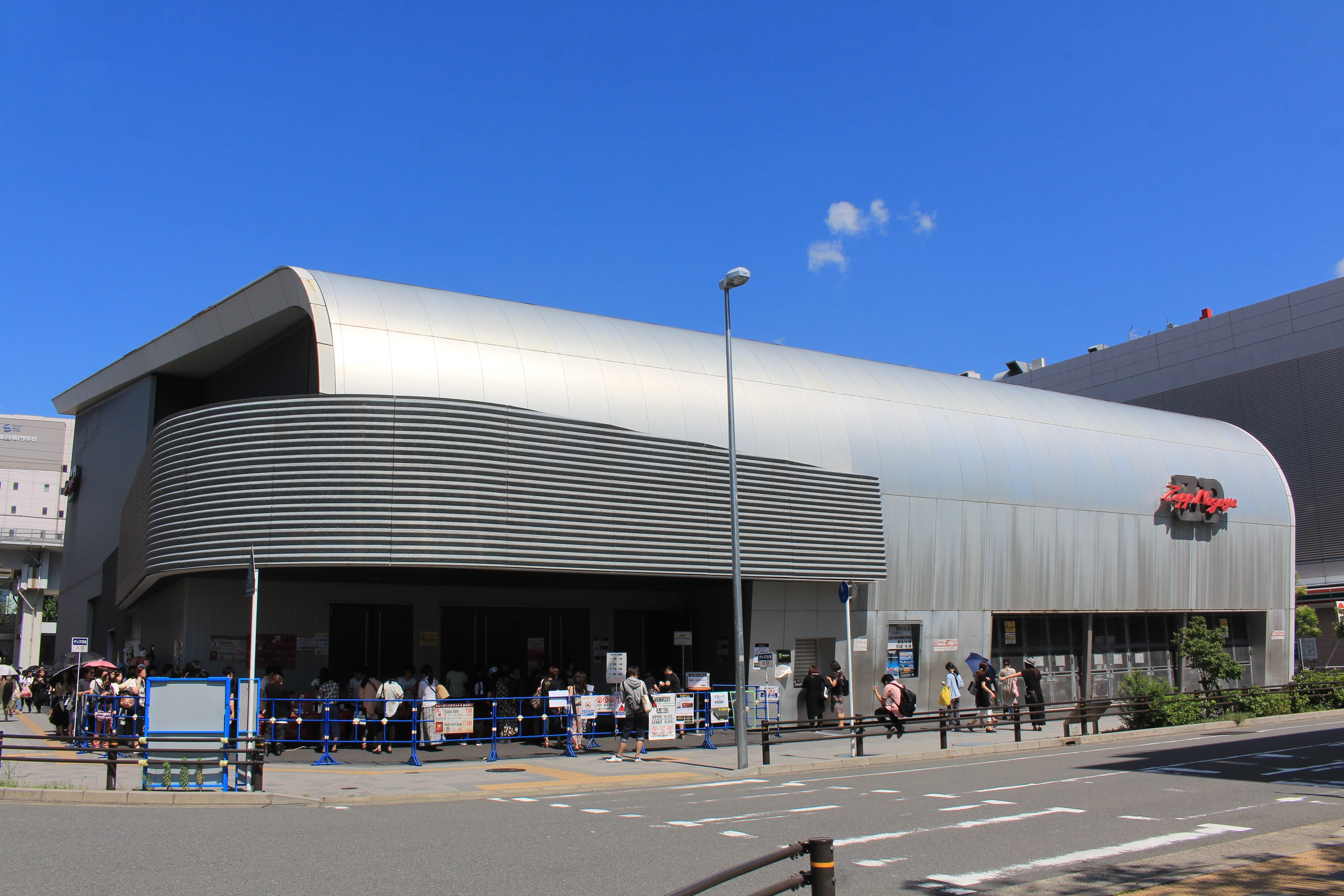
Zepp Nagoya

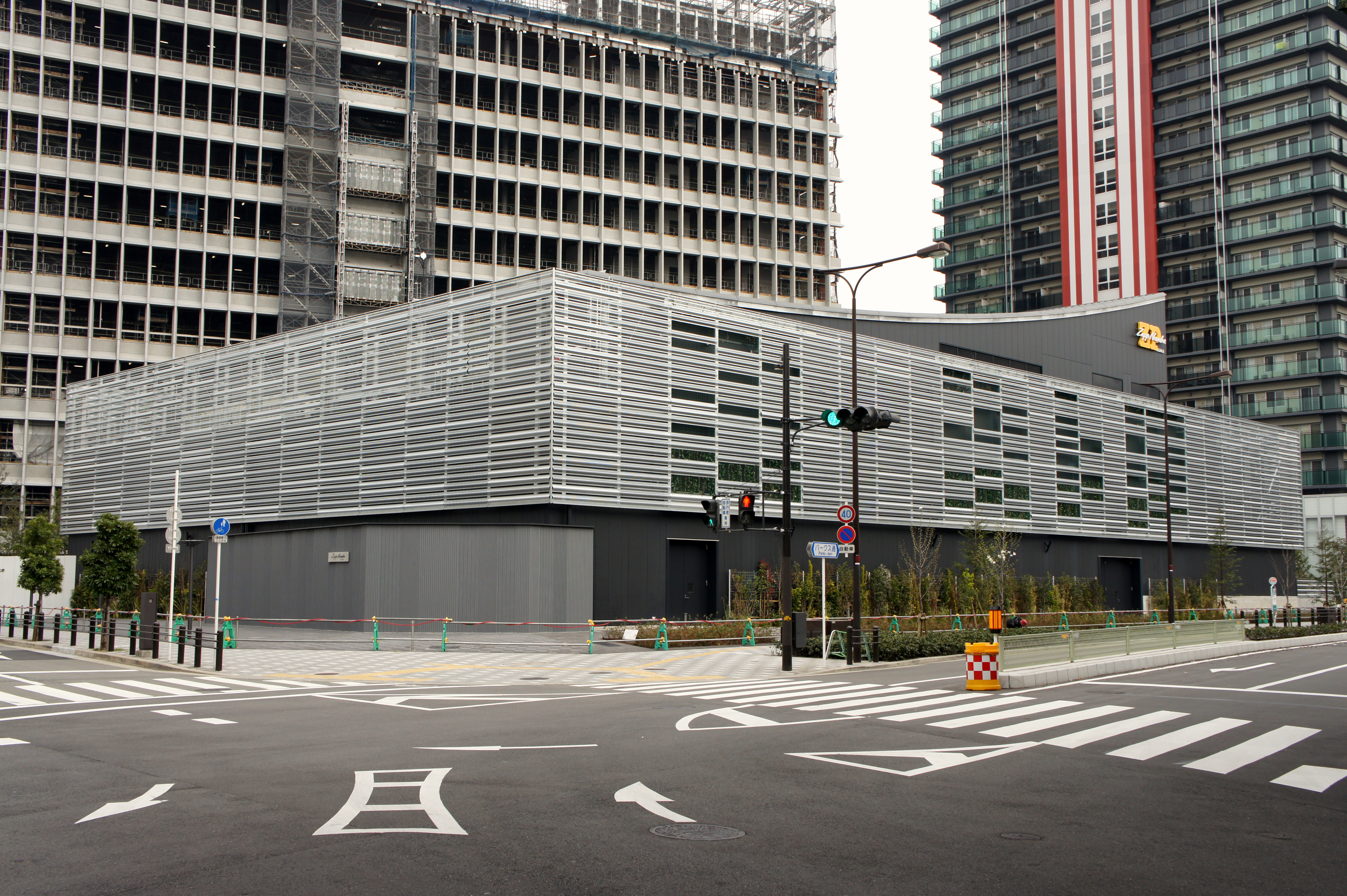
Zepp Namba

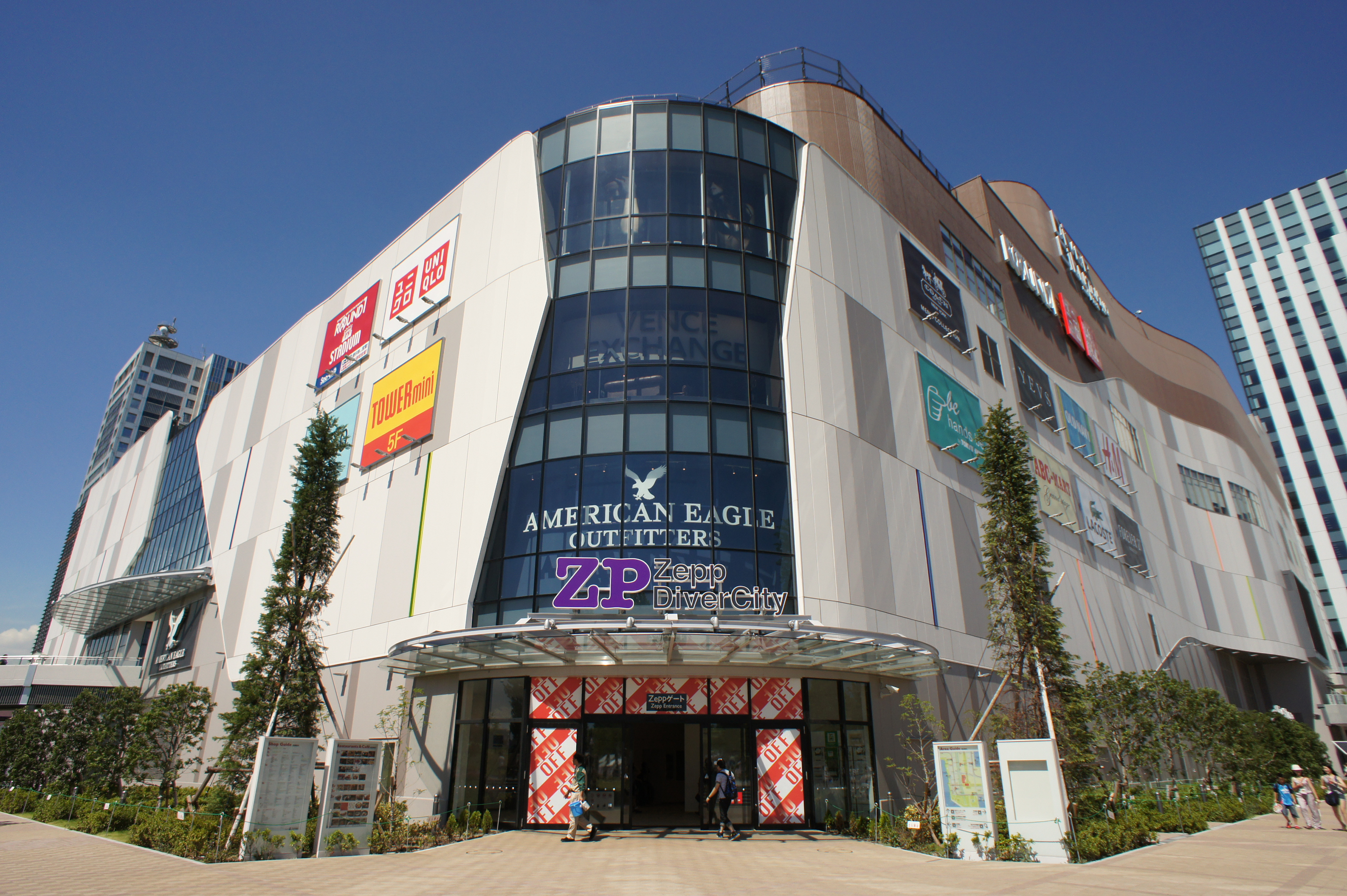
Zepp DiverCity

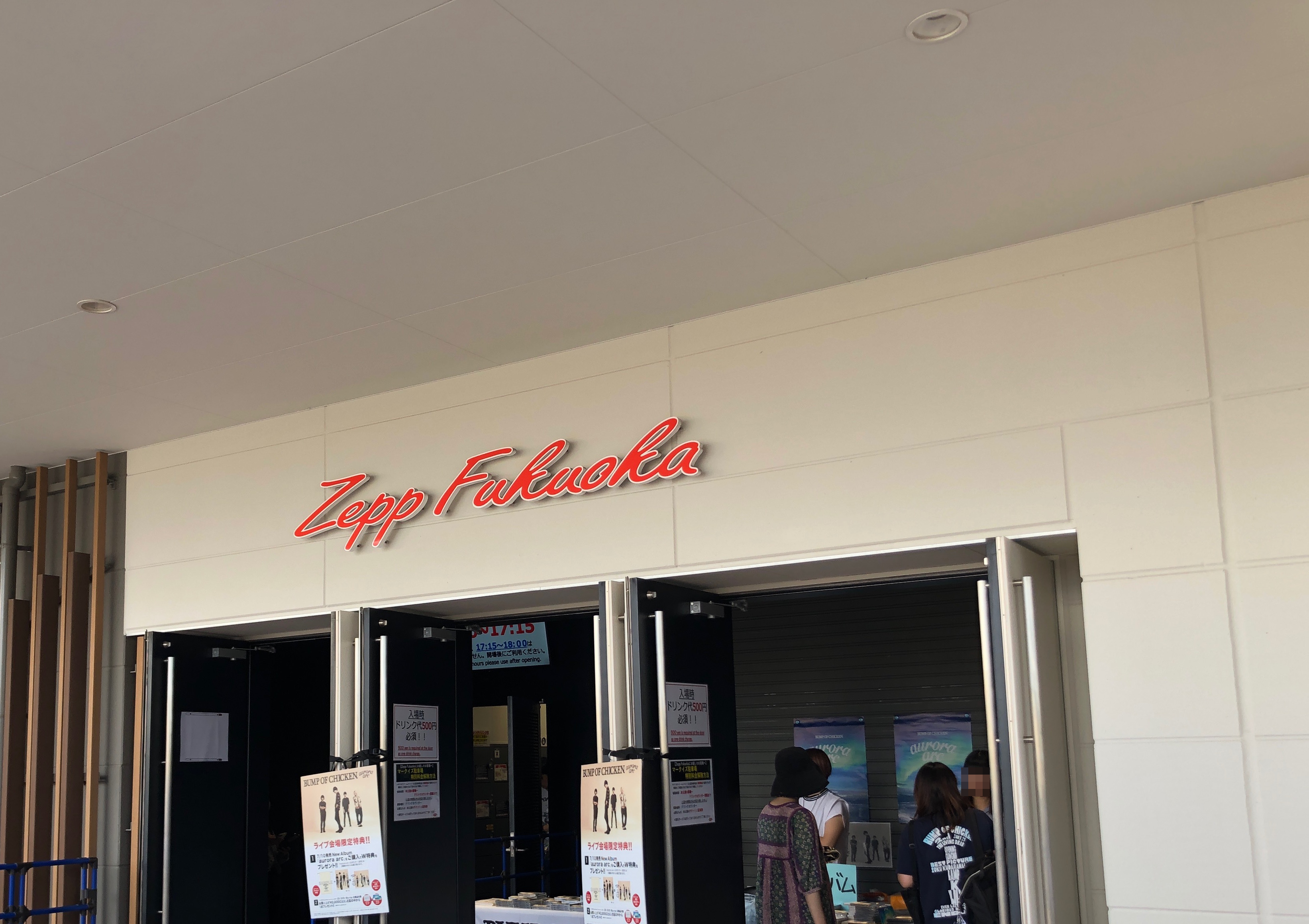
Zepp Fukuoka

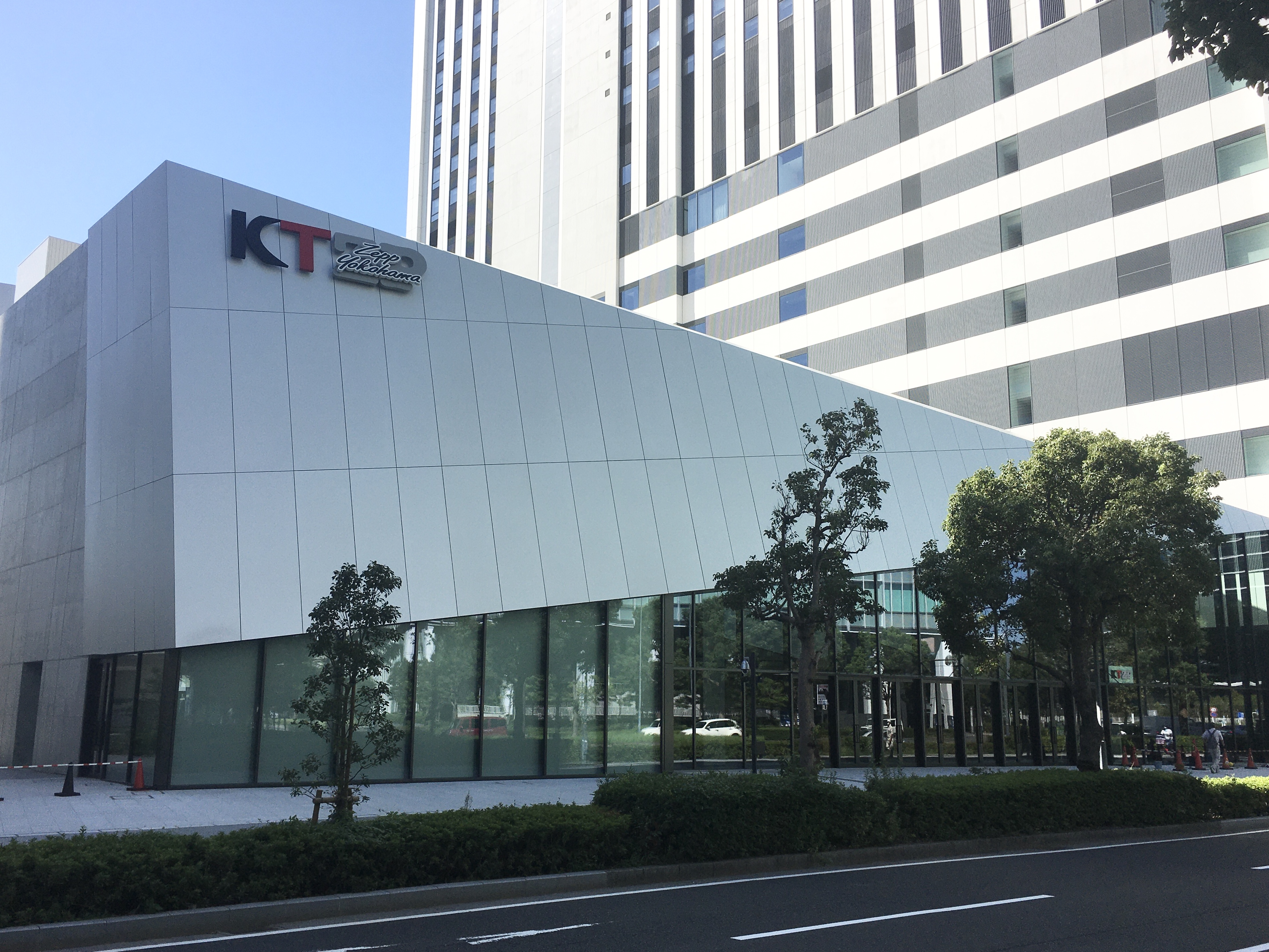
KT Zepp Yokohama

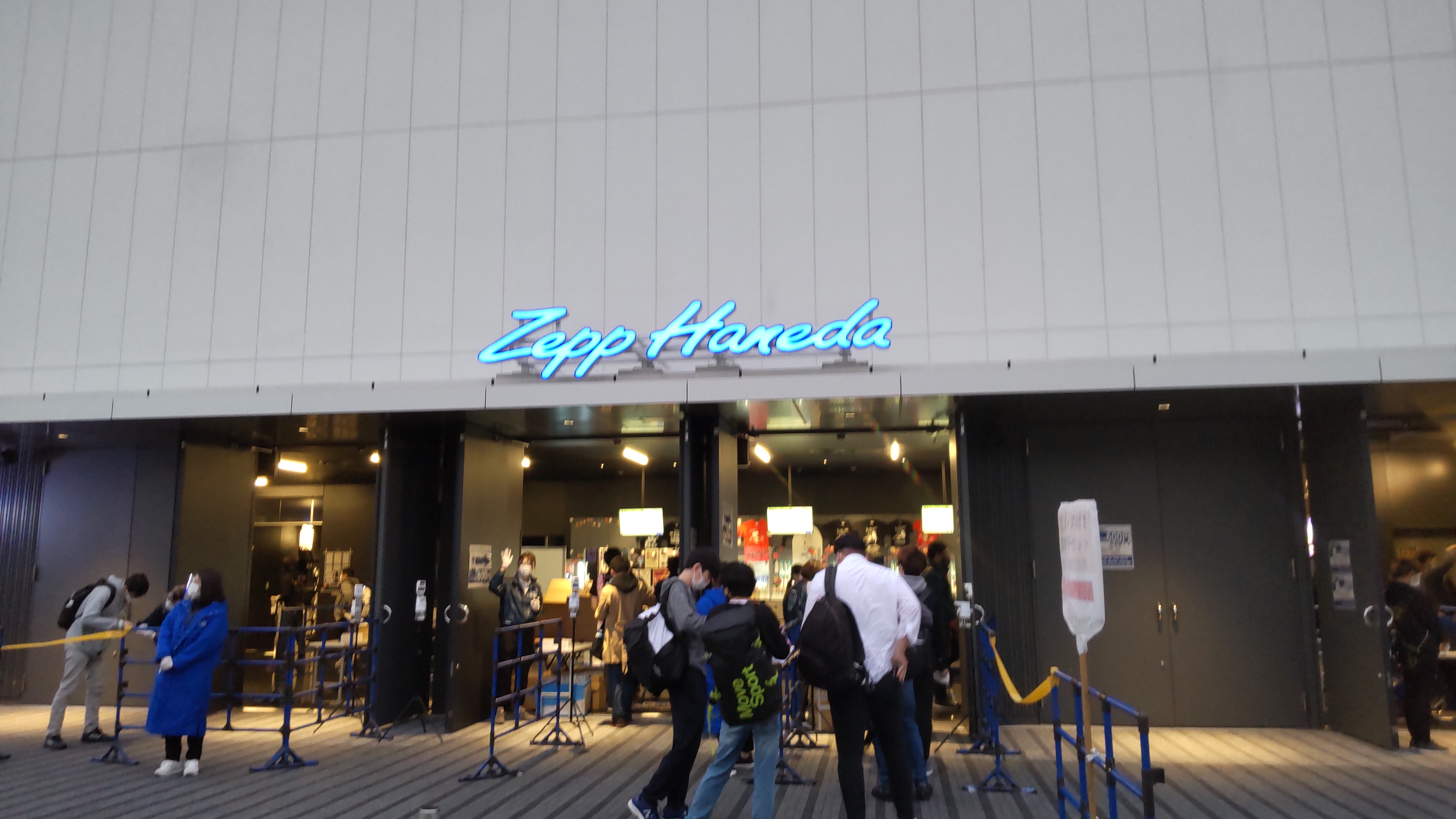
Zepp Haneda

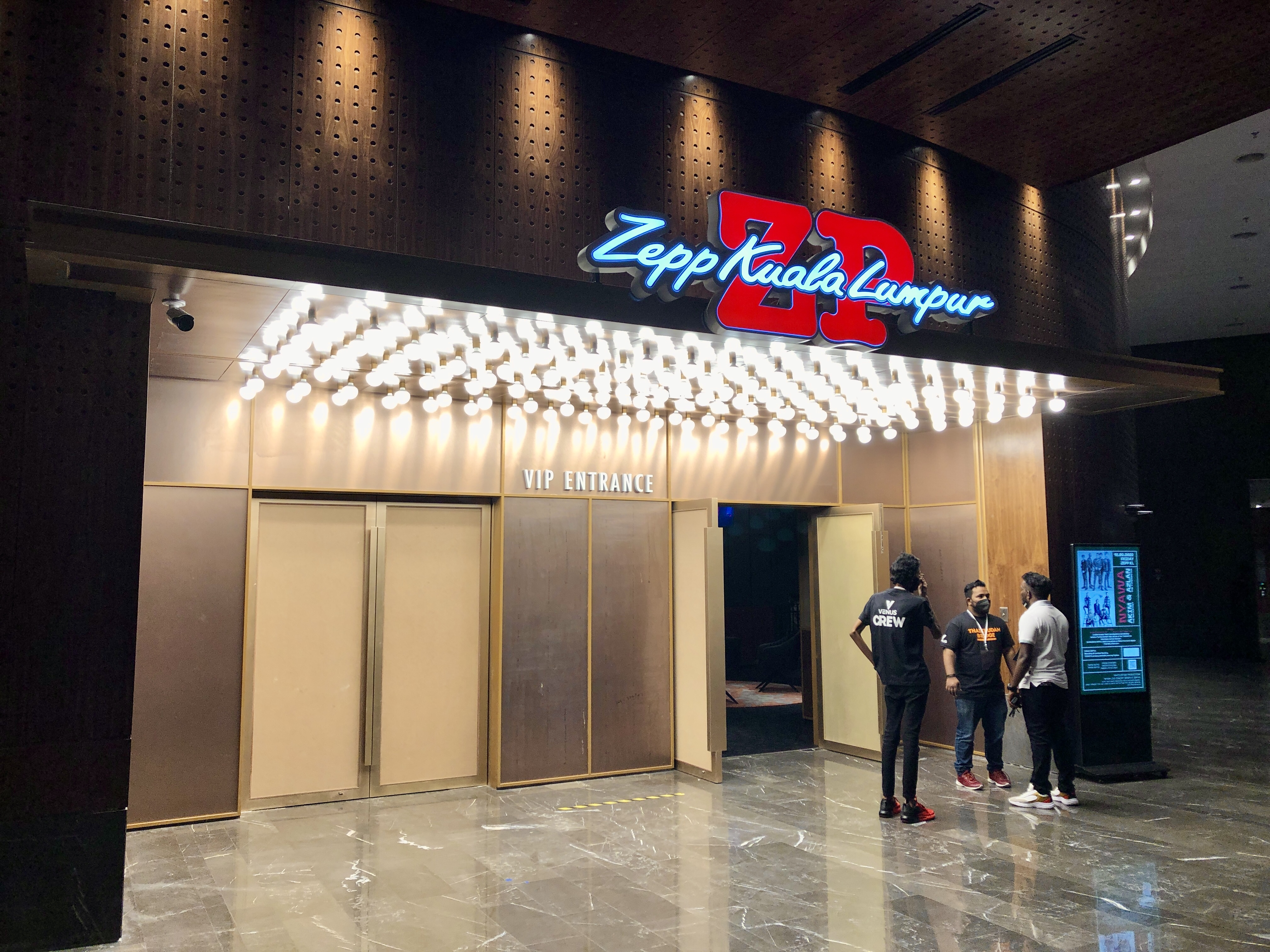
Zepp Kuala Lumpur

=== Former ===
Name	Location	Opened	Closed	Capacity
Zepp Osaka	Osaka	24 November 1998	8 April 2012	2,200
Zepp Fukuoka	Fukuoka	5 June 1999	9 May 2016	2,001
Zepp Sendai	(Miyagi Prefecture) Sendai	1 August 2000	1 July 2012	1,500
Zepp Blue Theater Roppongi	Tokyo	January 2015	November 2017	901
Zepp@BigBox	Singapore	5 June 2017	4 October 2019	2,333–4,032
Zepp Tokyo	Tokyo	20 March 1999	1 January 2022	3,009

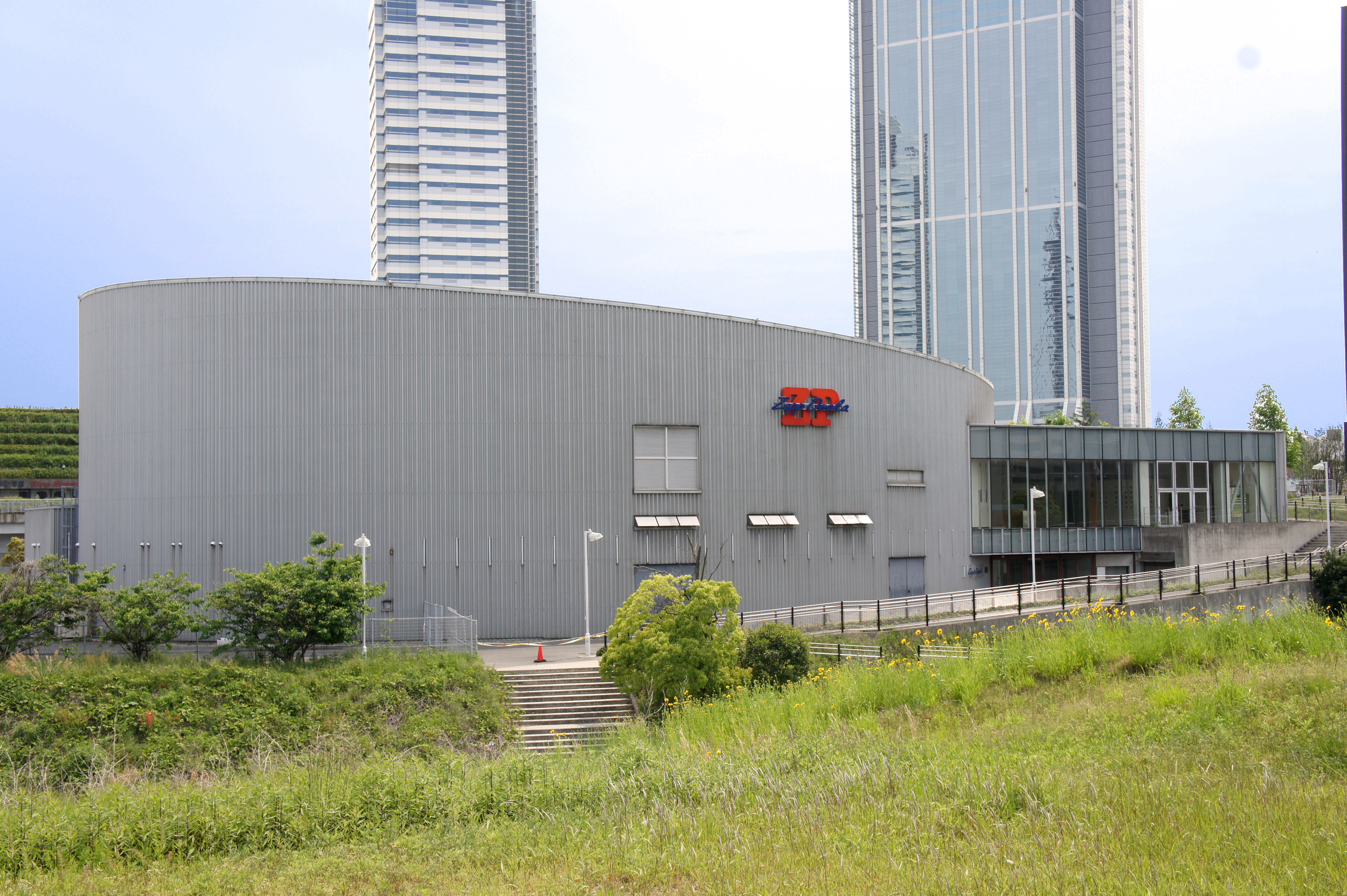
Former Zepp Osaka

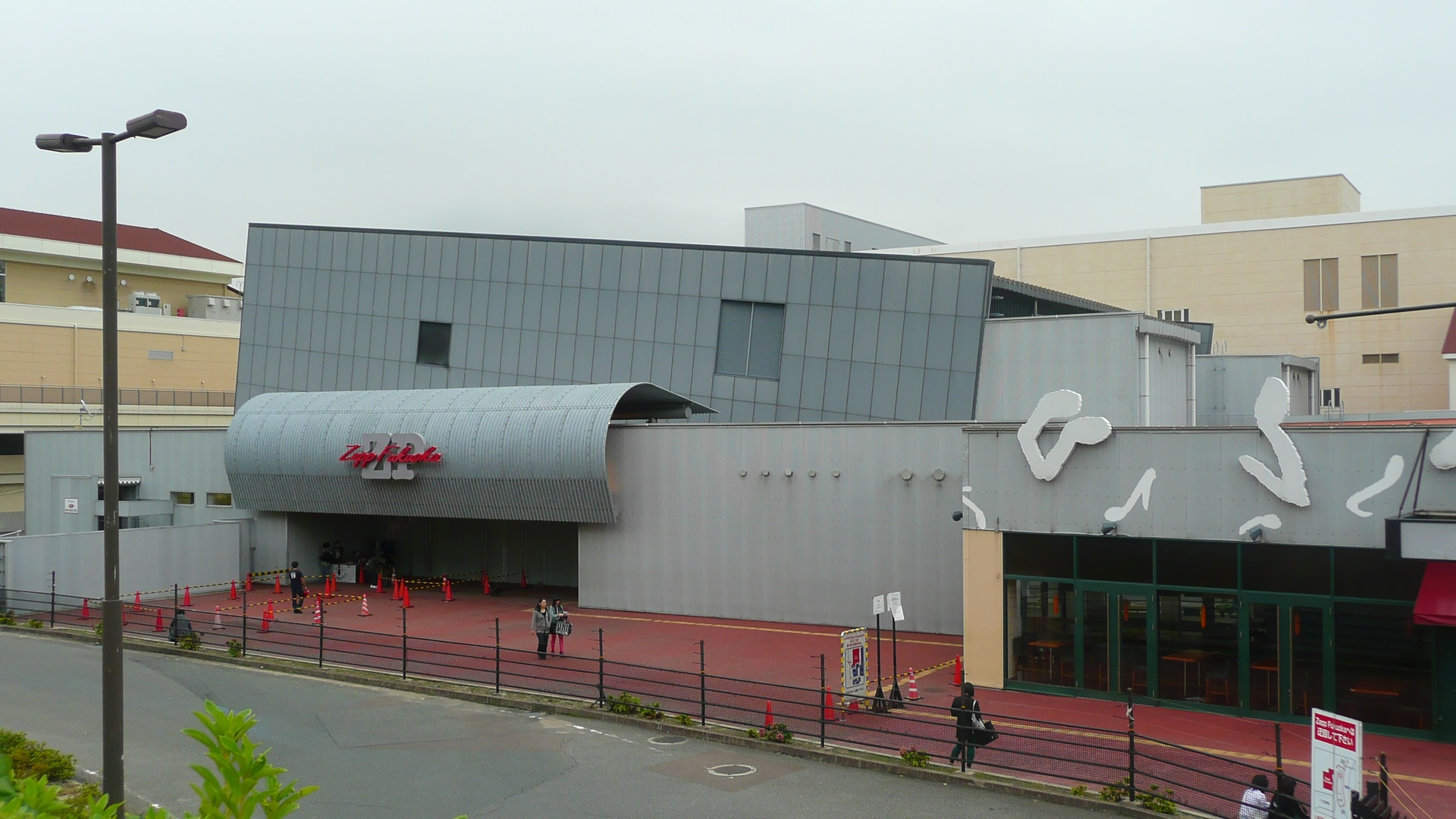
Former Zepp Fukuoka

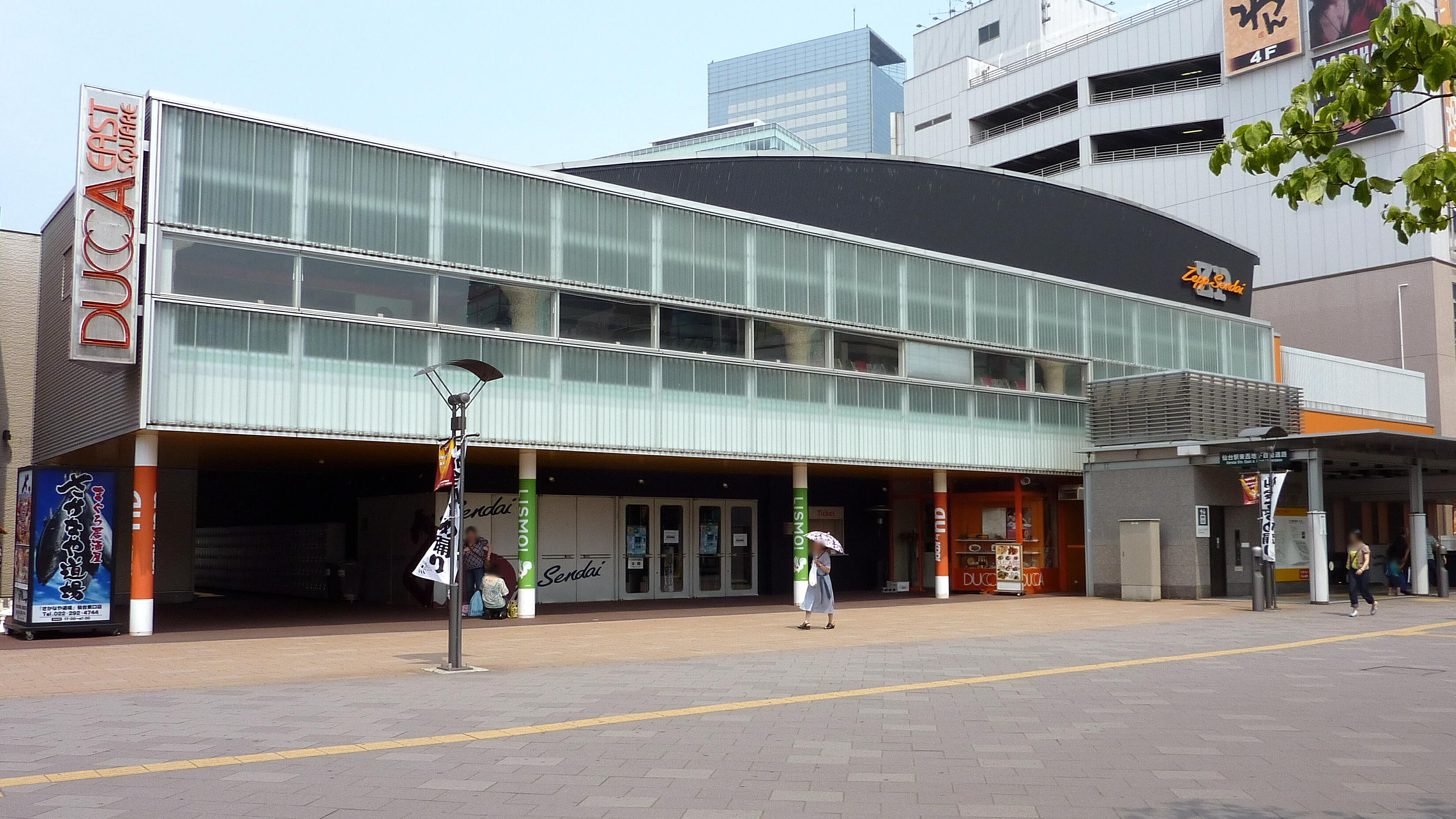
Former Zepp Sendai

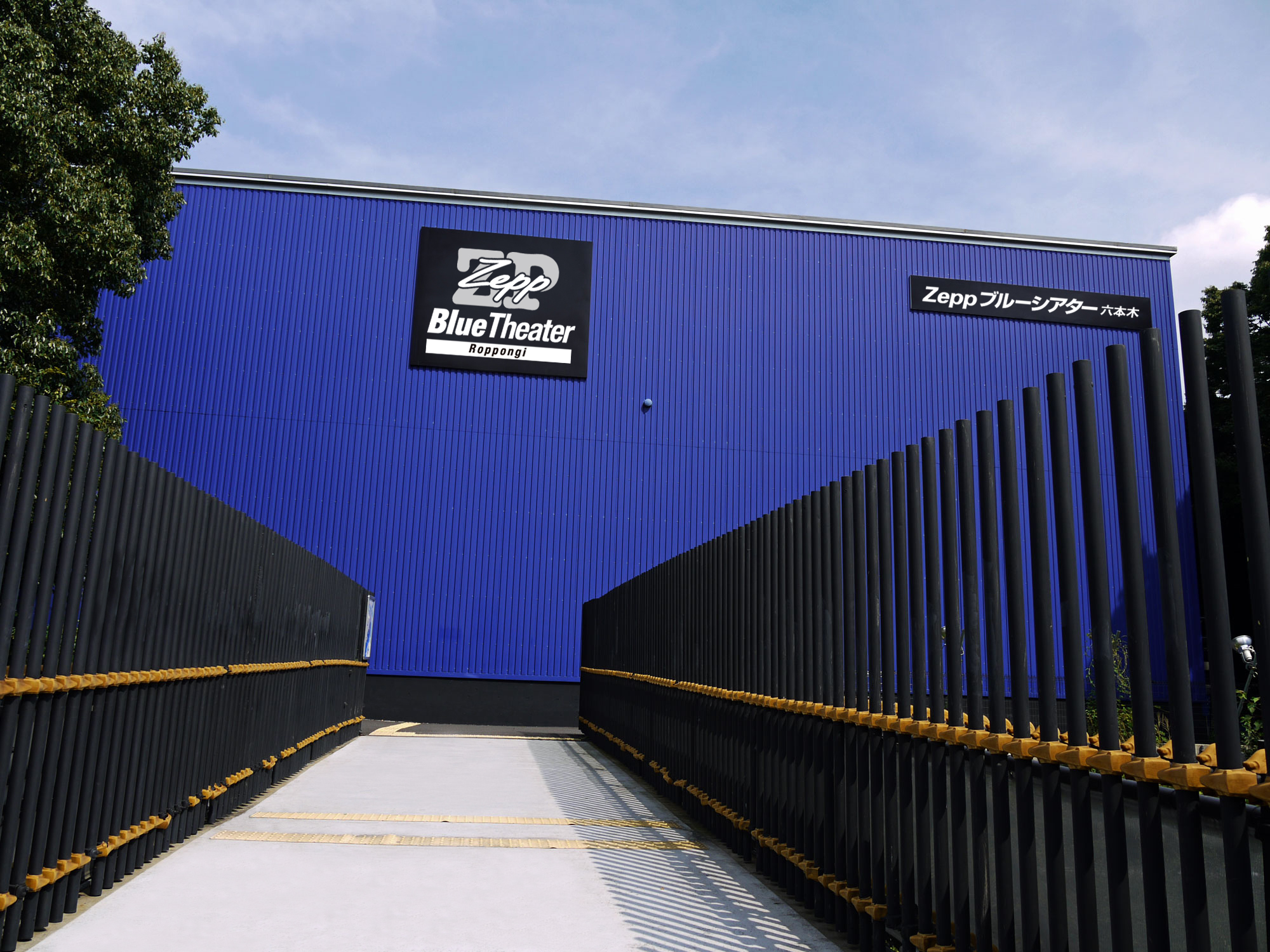
Former Zepp Blue Theater Roppongi

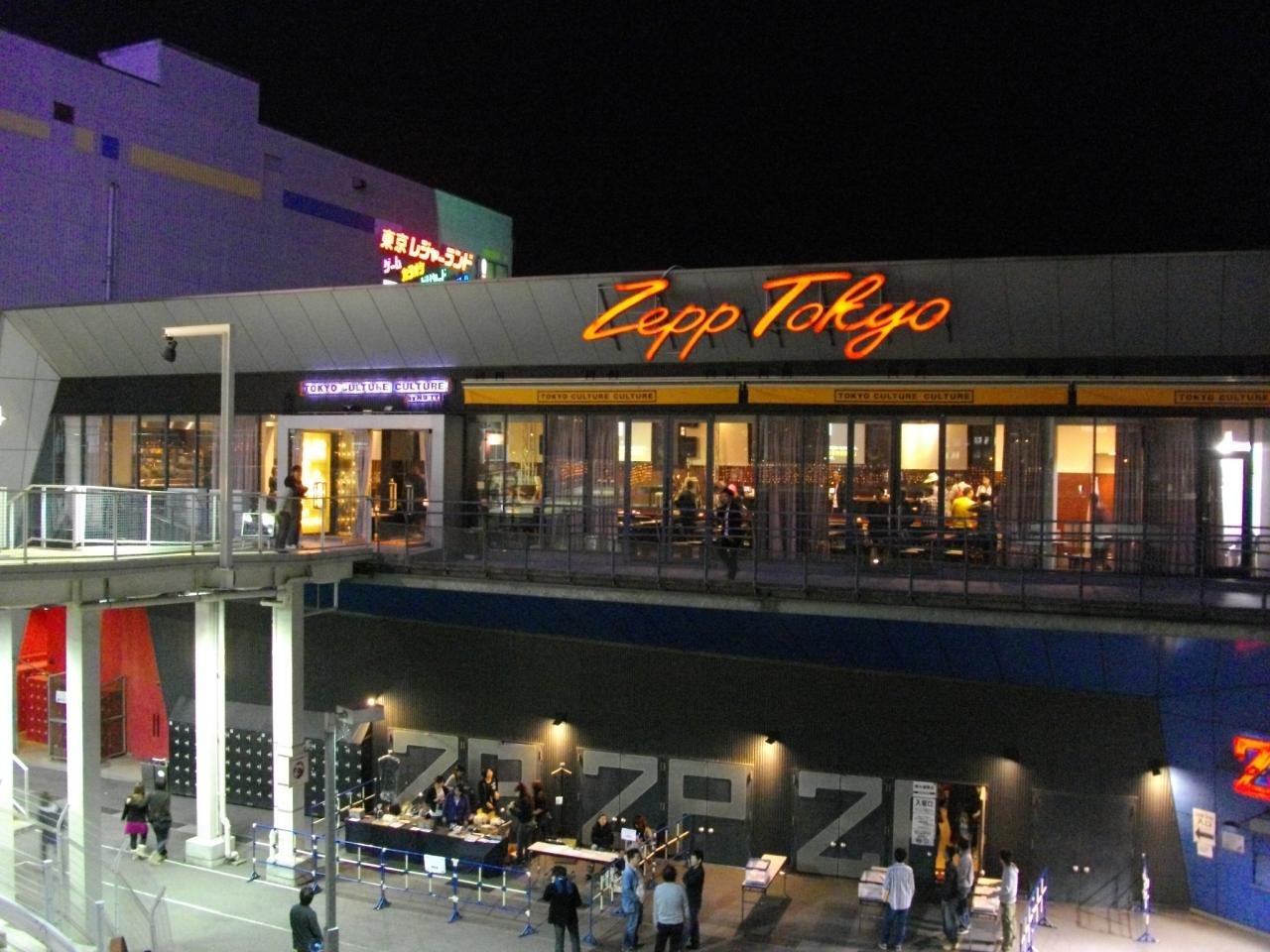
Former Zepp Tokyo

== Shareholders ==
- Asahi Breweries
- Avex Group
- Sony Music Entertainment Japan
- PLDT
- J Trust Bank
- Bushiroad
- Cignal
- Anibee.TV
