= Bank Maspion =

Indonesian bank

Coordinates: 7.266643°S 112.740633°E

PT Bank Maspion Indonesia Tbk

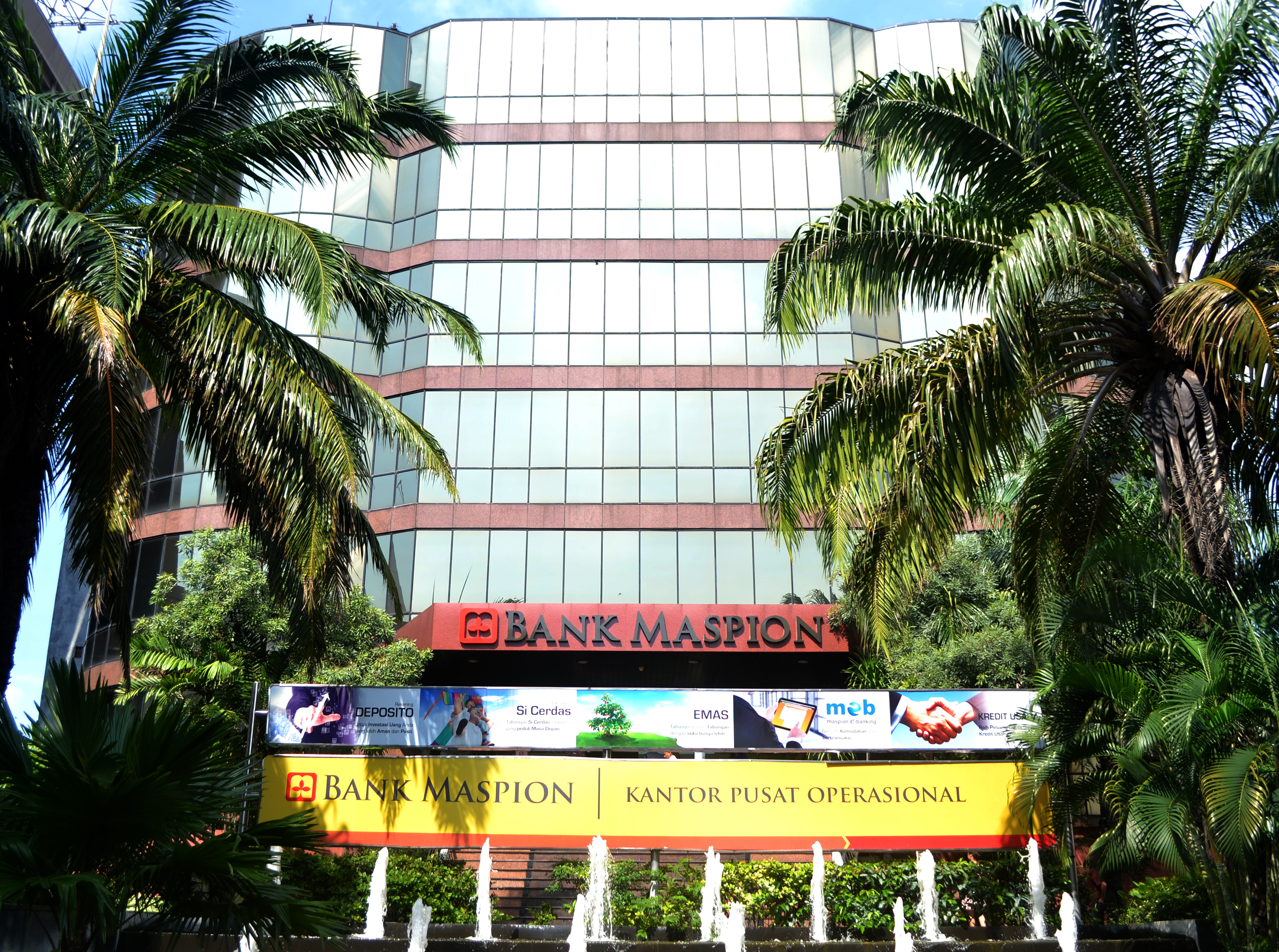
- Headquarters of Bank Maspion
- Company type: Public
- Traded as: IDX: BMAS
- Industry: Banking; Financial services
- Founded: 6 November 1989; 36 years ago
- Headquarters: Surabaya, Indonesia
- Area served: Indonesia
- Products: Credit cards Retail banking Commercial banking Investment banking Private banking Financial analysis Private equity
- Revenue: ▲ Rp 523.188 billion (2016)
- Net income: ▲ Rp 68.158 billion (2016)
- Owner: Kasikornbank
- Website: www.bankmaspion.co.id

PT Bank Maspion Indonesia Tbk is an Indonesian banking and financial services public company established in 1989, and based in Surabaya. It is part of the Kasikornbank group of companies.

== See also ==
- List of banks in Indonesia
