= Bank Sinarmas =

Bank of Indonesia

PT Bank Sinarmas Tbk
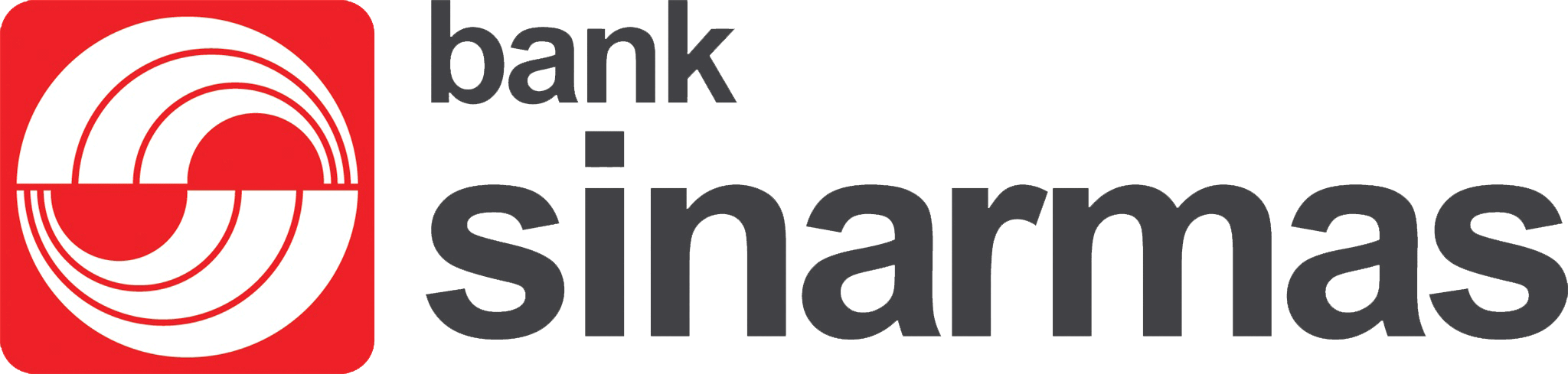
- Formerly: PT Bank Shinta Indonesia (1989-2006)
- Company type: Public
- Traded as: IDX: BSIM
- Industry: Financial services
- Founded: 18 August 1989; 36 years ago
- Headquarters: Jakarta, Indonesia
- Area served: Indonesia
- Key people: Frenky Tirtowijoyo (Chief executive officer); Tjendrawati Widjaja (Commissioner)
- Products: Saving; Mutual fund; Credit card; Loan; Funding
- Brands: Simas
- Revenue: Rp 2,188 trillion (2020)
- Net income: Rp 263,870 billion (2020)
- Total assets: Rp 44,612 trillion (2020)
- Total equity: Rp 6,057 trillion (2020)
- Owner: PT Sinar Mas Multiartha Tbk (59,99%); Public (40,01%)
- Number of employees: 6,957 (2020)
- Website: www.banksinarmas.com

PT Bank Sinarmas Tbk is a subsidiary of Sinar Mas Multiartha engaged in banking. To support its business activities, by the end of 2020, the bank has 69 branch offices, 134 sub-branch offices, 140 cash offices, 28 sharia branch offices, and 12 sharia cash offices.

== History ==
The bank started its history in 1989 under the name "PT Bank Shinta Indonesia", and is owned by the Hermijanto family-owned Shinta Group which is engaged in the textile and manufacturing industries. In 1993, the bank opened a branch office in Bandung, and a year later, the Ministry of Finance designated the bank as a perception bank. In 1995, the bank was also designated as a foreign exchange bank. In 1996, the bank opened a branch office in Surabaya. In April 2005, PT Sinar Mas Multiartha Tbk and PT Shinta Utama officially became the majority shareholders of this bank which at that time had an asset of IDR 436 billion. By the end of 2006, the bank had changed its name to what it is today and its assets had reached Rp 2 trillion. In 2009, the bank established a Sharia Business Unit (Indonesian: Unit Usaha Syariah). The bank was also designated by Bappebti as a depository bank for compensation fund margins and guarantee funds, and received a license from Bapepam to carry out trustee activities. In 2010, the bank was officially listed on the Indonesia Stock Exchange. In 2018, the bank was designated as a deposit recipient bank for the Hajj Pilgrimage Organizer Fee (Indonesian: Biaya Penyelenggara Ibadah Haji).
