= Bank Syariah Indonesia =

State-owned Islamic bank in Indonesia

PT Bank Syariah Indonesia (Persero) Tbk

- The Tower Jakarta, where BSI is headquartered
- Company type: Public
- Traded as: IDX: BRIS
- Industry: Islamic banking and finance
- Predecessors: Bank Syariah Mandiri; Bank BNI Syariah; Bank BRIsyariah
- Founded: 17 November 2008; 17 years ago (as BRIsyariah); 1 February 2021; 5 years ago (as Bank Syariah Indonesia)
- Headquarters: The Tower Jakarta, Jakarta, Indonesia
- Key people: Anggoro Eko Cahyo (President Director); Muhadjir Effendy (President Commissioner)
- Revenue: ▲Rp 26.065 trillion (2025)
- Net income: ▲Rp 7.56 trillion (2025)
- Total assets: ▲Rp 456.19 trillion (2025)
- Total equity: ▲Rp 51.95 trilion (2025)
- Owners: Government of Indonesia (ultimate controlling shareholder through Danantara): Bank Mandiri (51.47%); Bank Negara Indonesia (23.24%); Bank Rakyat Indonesia (15.38%)
- Number of employees: 16,581 (2025)
- Website: bankbsi.co.id

PT Bank Syariah Indonesia (Persero) Tbk (lit. 'Sharia Bank of Indonesia', abbreviated as BSI) is a state-owned Islamic bank in Indonesia. The bank was officially founded on 1 February 2021 as a result of merger between state-owned sharia banks.

Bank Syariah Indonesia has obtained the merger permit from the Financial Services Authority (OJK) dated 27 January 2021, using BRI Syariah as the surviving company. As of June 2024, BSI is the world's largest Islamic bank by customer numbers. BSI ATMs do not accept foreign cards.

== History ==
BRI Syariah, one of the pre-merger banks and the surviving company

BSI originated from three state-owned banks which are subsidiary of larger banks: BRIsyariah (of Bank Rakyat Indonesia/BRI), Bank Syariah Mandiri (of Bank Mandiri) and BNI Syariah (of Bank Negara Indonesia/BNI).

- Bank Syariah Mandiri: The bank was founded in 1955 as Bank Industri Nasional ("National Industrial Bank"); in 1967 it was changed into Bank Maritim Indonesia ("Maritime Bank of Indonesia") and was changed again in 1973 into Bank Susila Bakti. In 1999, the newly founded Bank Mandiri became majority shareholder of the bank, and was converted to sharia banking in 1999 as Bank Syariah Mandiri.
- BNI Syariah: The bank was founded on 29 April 2000 as a sharia banking unit of BNI. In 2010, it spun-off as a separate subsidiary.
- BRIsyariah: The bank was originally established on 3 July 1969 as Bank Djasa Arta (later spelled Bank Jasa Arta) and headquartered in Bandung, West Java. On 19 December 2007, the bank was acquired by BRI. Following Bank Indonesia permit on 16 October 2008, it was converted to sharia banking and officially operated as BRI Syariah on 17 November 2008; in 2009 the sharia banking unit of BRI was officially merged to the bank. In 2018, the bank went public in Indonesian Stock Exchange.

Before the establishment of its rival Bank Syariah Nasional (BSN) in October 2025, BSI were supposed to acquire another state-owned bank BTN Syariah, which was founded on 14 February 2005 as a sharia banking unit of Bank Tabungan Negara (BTN). But BTN instead was supposed to acquire Bank Muamalat Indonesia (BMI) and it would be finished in March 2024. As of July 2024, the acquisition plan of BMI by BTN was cancelled due to due diligence results. BTN then acquired 100% shares of Bank Victoria Syariah (BVIS) on 5 June 2025 as a step to facilitate the spin-off of the sharia banking unit into a BTN subsidiary.

On 22 December 2025, based on the results of the Extraordinary General Meeting of Shareholders (EGMS), due to the inclusion of Indonesian government' special rights of the Republic of Indonesia in the ownership of Series A Dwiwarna Shares in BSI, the corporate status of the bank changed from previously a subsidiary of Bank Mandiri to a state-owned enterprise in the form of a state-owned perseroan terbatas (Persero). Therefore, the official name of BSI was changed to PT Bank Syariah Indonesia (Persero) Tbk,and the change of legal status took effect on 23 January 2026.

== Overseas branches ==
As of 2024, BSI is Indonesia's sixth-biggest bank in terms of assets. BSI has been trying to expand its business in the Middle East, having opened a representative office in Dubai International Financial Center in early January 2022. The bank is planning to open a branch in Saudi Arabia.
