= The Tower Jakarta =

Commercial office building in Jakarta, Indonesia

The Tower
- The Tower Gatot Subroto

General information
- Status: Completed
- Type: Commercial
- Location: Jakarta, Indonesia, Jalan Jenderal Gatot Subroto, Kav. 12
- Coordinates: 6.2251821°S 106.8174738°E
- Construction started: 2013
- Topped-out: 2015
- Completed: 2016

Height
- Architectural: 211.8 m (695 ft)
- Tip: 211.8 m (695 ft)
- Top floor: 198.1 m (650 ft)

Technical details
- Floor count: 50
- Floor area: 93,520 m^{2} (1,006,600 sq ft)

Design and construction
- Architect: Denton Corker Marshall
- Developer: PT Alam Sutera Realty Tbk
- Structural engineer: Davy Sukamta & Partners Structural Engineers
- Main contractor: PT Total Bangun Persada

Website
- www.thetower.id

The Tower is a 211.8 metres (695 feet) tall commercial office skyscraper located at Karet Semanggi, Setiabudi in South Jakarta, Indonesia. It is situated in the Golden Triangle of Jakarta. The building has 50 floors above and 5 floors below ground. It was completed in 2016.

== History ==
In May 2013, Alam Sutera Realty (ASRI), a real estate development company, announced that a 50-floor office building would be built at Jalan Jenderal Gatot Subroto, Lot 12 in Jakarta's Central Business District. Construction of the skyscraper officially began on 29 August 2013 and the company revealed its name as "The Tower". Work on the building was scheduled to finish by September 2016 and it was planned to open in early 2017. By December 2014, the structure's construction had reached floor 4 and as the building began to take its shape, the developer started to sell parts of the tower's office space to the market, which costed around Rp40 million per square meters at that time. The building was then topped out on 25 November 2015, becoming one of the tallest in Jakarta's Golden Triangle that year. It was completed in December 2016.

In September 2017, Alam Sutera increased its office space selling price to around Rp50 million per square meters. By September 2023, the company reported that The Tower's occupancy rate had reached 70 percent.

== Tenants ==
- Bank Syariah Indonesia
- China Taiping Insurance Indonesia

== See also ==
- List of tallest buildings in Indonesia
- List of tallest buildings in Jakarta
