= Pegadaian =

Indonesian financial services company

PT Pegadaian

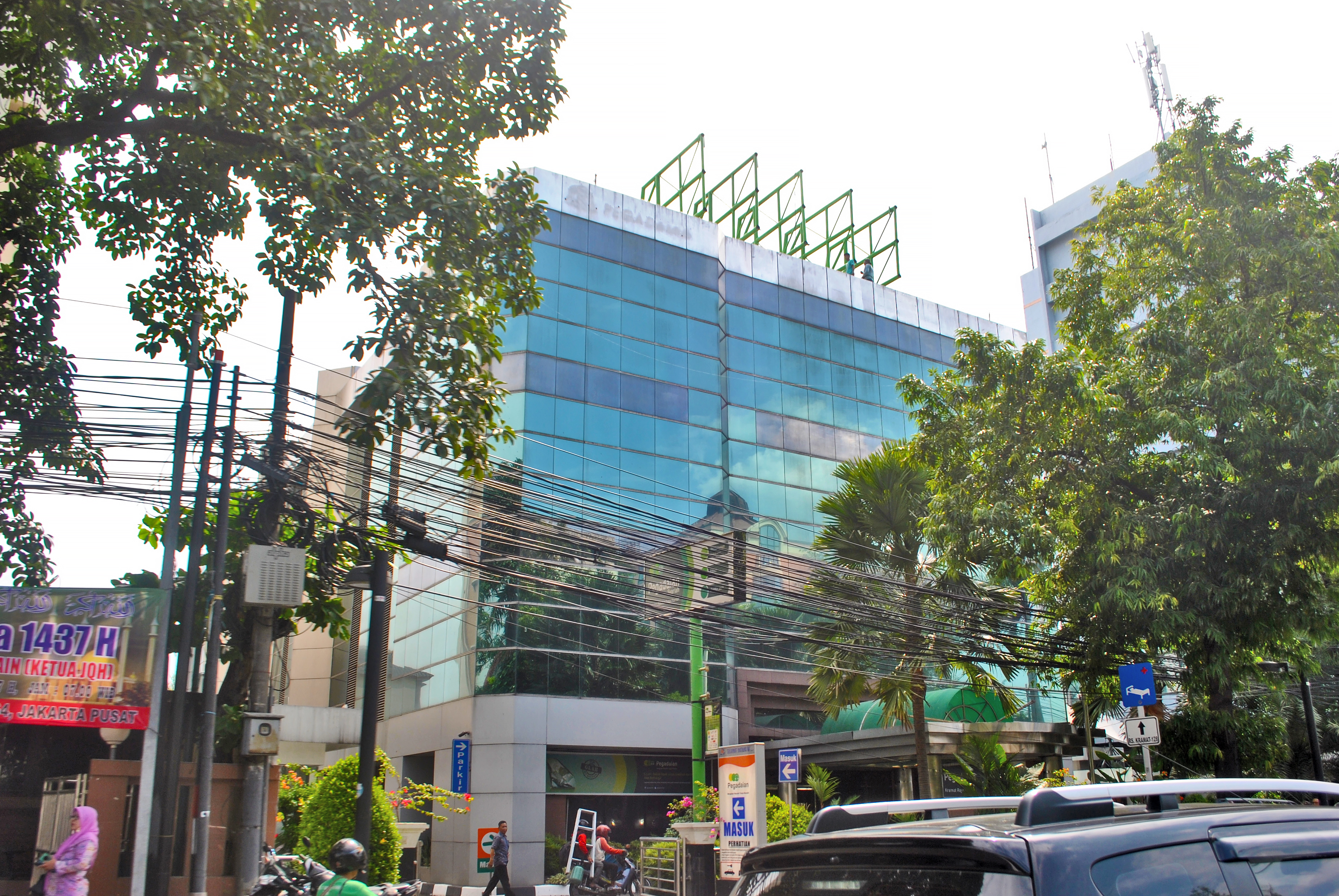
- Pegadaian headquarters in Jakarta
- Type: Subsidiary
- Industry: Financial services
- Founded: 1 April 1901 (nationalization of all pawnbrokers)
- Headquarters: Jakarta, Indonesia
- Area served: Indonesia
- Key people: Kuswiyoto; CEO, from 2019
- Services: Pawnbroking
- Revenue: ▲ Rp 17.69 trillion (2019)
- Net income: ▲ Rp 3.11 trillion (2019)
- Total assets: ▲ Rp 65.32 trillion (2019)
- Total equity: ▲ Rp 23 trillion (2019)
- Parent: Bank Rakyat Indonesia
- Subsidiaries: PT Balai Lelang Artha Gasia
- Website: www.pegadaian.co.id

PT Pegadaian (Persero) is an Indonesian state-owned pawnbroker operated as a subsidiary of Bank Rakyat Indonesia (BRI) start from 2021. Formerly a pawnbroking monopoly, its monopoly was legalized in a Dutch East Indies government decree. Several savings and loan co-operatives de facto also offer pawnbroking services.

== History ==
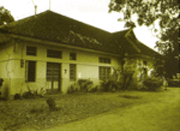
The first Pegadaian building at Sukabumi

As a state-owned enterprise, Pegadaian has a long history which began in the 18th century when Dutch East India Company (VOC), established a Bank van Lening. Then the Dutch East Indian government issued State Gazette no. 131 of 12 March 1901 that principally govern that establishment of pawnshop was monopolized and only government runs such business. In accordance with this law, the first Pegadaian was established in Sukabumi, West Java on 1 April 1901.

Pegadaian's old logo

In the early days of the government of the Republic of Indonesia, the office was moved to the Pegadaian Karanganyar, Kebumen because of the increasingly heated war. Dutch Military Aggression II forced office of Pegadaian moved again to Magelang. After the war of independence, Perjan Pegadaian back to Jakarta and Pegadaian run by the Government of the Republic of Indonesia. In this period, Pegadaian has several times changed status, namely as a Perusahaan Negara (PN) since January 1, 1961, then by Regulation No.7/1969 a Bureau Company (Testament), and then based on Government Regulation. 10/1990 (as amended by Government Regulation No.103/2000) changed again into Perusahaan Umum (Perum). Later in 2011, the status change occurred again from Perum to the PT as set out in Government Regulation (PP) No.51/2011 which was signed on December 13, 2011. However, the change is effective after the base budget is submitted to the authorities on 1 April 2012.

On 2 July 2021, the government of Indonesia officially handed over its Pegadaian shares to Bank Rakyat Indonesia through Government Regulation Number 73 of 2021, as part of the formation of a state-owned holding engaged in the ultra-micro finance sector.

== Products ==
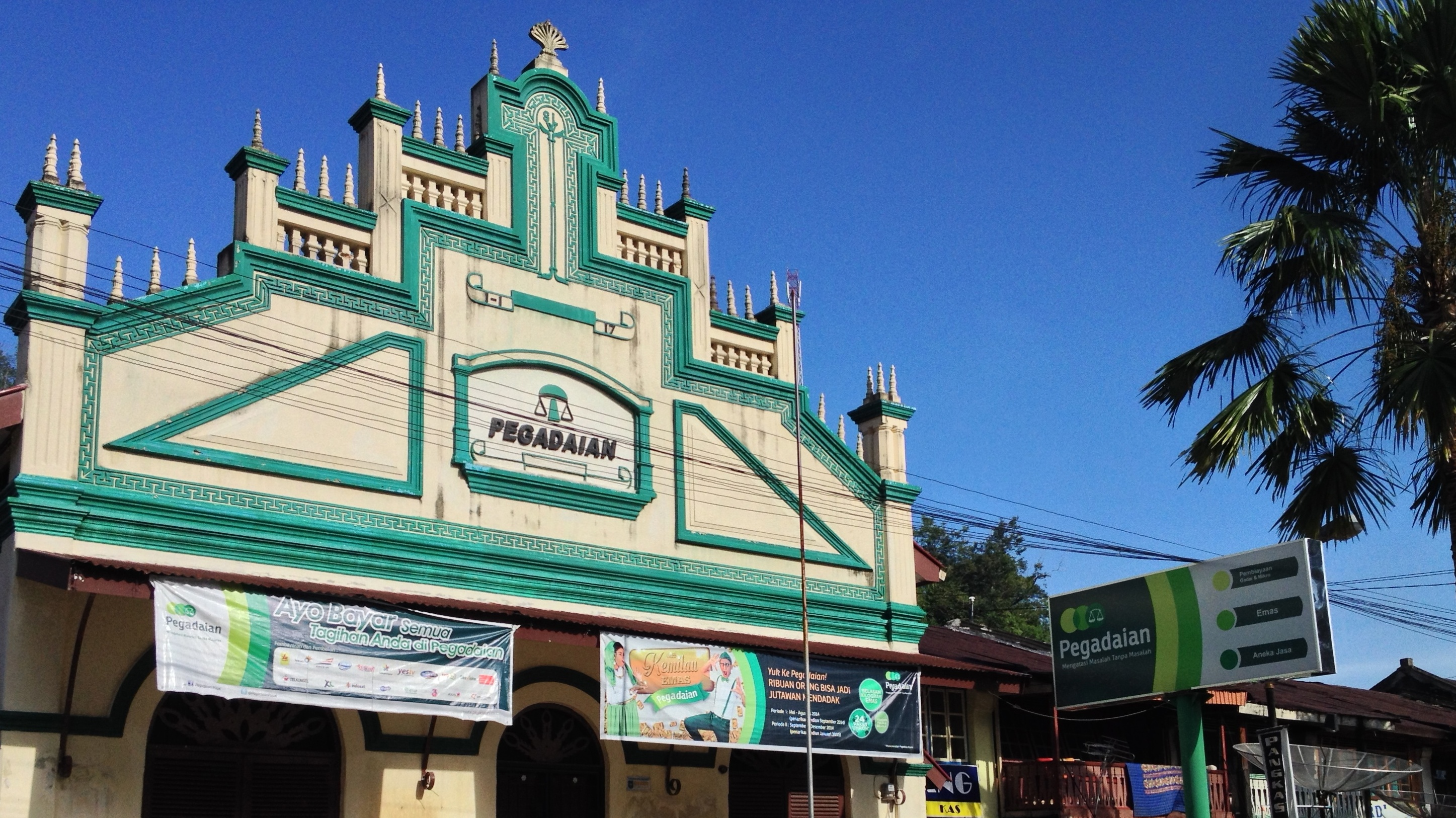
Pegadaian branch in Sawahlunto, West Sumatra, formerly a comedy house during colonial times

Until now, there are many people who know Pegadaian from its core business; fiduciary. Here are some of the Pegadaian's services:

=== Conventional ===
==== Conventional pawnbroking (KCA / Kredit Cepat Aman - Fast Secure Credit) ====
Pegadaian's standard product is the standard pawnbroking product. A valuable item such as jewellery, motor vehicles or electronics is pawned.

The credit term is 120 days. The interest rate will vary according to amount borrowed and is per 15 days or part thereof. The minimum interest rate is 0.75% for each 15 day period, but higher rates such as 1% per 15 days are typical.

In addition, a fixed insurance premium of Rp 1,000 is payable to the national insurance company Jasa Raharja. This pays 50% of the amount borrowed, to a maximum of Rp 2,500,000 in case of death. In addition, the insurance covers the interest due, up to Rp 20,000,000, in case of death by natural causes. In case of death by accident, the insurance also covers the principal, to a maximum of Rp 100,000,000.

In addition to the insurance, an administration fee is payable at the time of pawning.

For example, if borrowing 1.3 million rp against gold worth 5 million, administration + insurance of Rp 21,000 would be charged. At 1%/15 days, Rp 104,000 interest would be due after 120 days. The pawning could then be extended with the interest rolled up with the principal, subject to a payment of new administration + insurance.

Thus in this case 1.3 million borrowed and extended to 360 days would incur total interest (assuming 1%/15 days) & fees of Rp 400,000. The lowest annual interest rate possible is 18.25%, but this does not include the administration/insurance. In addition, by counting interest in full 15 day periods, the actual interest earned by Pegadaian will tend to be higher than advertised.

==== Kreasi ====
This product is aimed at micro and small business loans as an alternative to collateral reg (fiduciary) and loan repayment through installments.

==== Krasida ====
Krasida is lending to the micro-small entrepreneur on the basis of the return of mortgage loans through installments.

==== Krista ====
Krista is the provision of loans to micro households in need of funds in the form of working capital loans through the loan repayment installments.

==== Kremada ====
Kremada is provision of loans to the low-income groups to build or repair housing with return in installments. Cooperate with the Ministry of Housing.

==== Kucica ====
Kucica is money remittance service, and cooperate with Western Union.

=== Sharia ===
==== Rahn ====
Rahn is a product fiduciary services are based on the principles of Sharia with reference to the modern administrative system.

==== Arrum ====
Arrum is a product of the construction guarantee micro-fiduciary for small businesses with Islamic principles.

==== Mulia ====
Mulia is gold selling by Pegadaian to the public who are interested to invest in gold for cash and installment. Gold has been purchased from Mulia can be sold back at the Noble Exchange at a later date if the needed money in a short time.

== Slogan ==
The company slogan of Pegadaian is Mengatasi Masalah Tanpa Masalah (English: Overcoming Problems Without Problems).
