= Capital Market and Financial Institutions Supervisory Agency =

Capital Market and Financial Institutions Supervisory Agency (Indonesian: Badan Pengawas Pasar Modal dan Lembaga Keuangan) (shortly BAPEPAM-LK) is an institution under the Ministry of Finance (Indonesia) tasked with fostering, regulating, and supervising day-to-day capital market activities as well as formulating and implementing policies and technical standardization in the field of financial institutions. The current Chairman of Bapepam-LK is Nurhaida.

Bapepam-LK was a merger of the Capital Market Supervisory Agency (Bapepam) and the Directorate General of Financial Institutions. Currently, Bapepam-LK is replaced by the Financial Services Authority (Indonesia) (OJK) since the enactment of Law of the Republic of Indonesia Number 21 of 2011.

== Functions ==
The functions of Bapepam-LK are:

- Formulation and enforcement of regulations in the field of primary and secondary capital markets
- Enforcement of regulations in the capital market
- Guidance and supervision of parties obtaining business license, approval, registration from the Agency and other parties engaged in the capital market
- Determination of the principles of corporate disclosure for Issuers and Public Companies
- Settlement of objections filed by parties imposed sanctions by the Stock Exchange, Clearing and Guarantee, and Depository and Settlement Institution
- Determination of accounting provisions in the field of capital market
- Preparation of policy formulation in the field of financial institutions
- Implementation of policies in the field of financial institutions, in accordance with applicable laws and regulations
- Formulation of standards, norms, guidelines criteria and procedures in the field of financial institutions
- Providing technical guidance and evaluation in the field of financial institutions
- Implementation of the Agency's administration

== Organizational structure ==
Bapepam-LK consisting of 1 Chairman of the Agency and overseeing 1 Secretariat and 12 Technical Bureaus, where the scope of guidance and supervision includes aspects of capital markets, pension funds, insurance, banking and business financing services and venture capital.

The Bapepam-LK technical bureau consists of:

- Bureau of Legislation and Legal Aid
- Bureau of Research and Information Technology
- Inspection and Investigation Bureau
- Investment Management Bureau
- Transaction Bureau and Securities Institution
- Service Sector Company Financial Assessment Bureau
- Real Sector Company Financial Assessment Bureau
- Bureau of Accounting Standards and Disclosure
- Banking, Financing and Guarantee Bureau
- Bureau of Insurance
- Pension Fund Bureau
- Internal Compliance Bureau

== Bapepam-LK Authority ==
The authority of Bapepam-LK is listed in Chapter II of the Capital Market Law (Indonesian: Undang-Undang Pasar Modal) (UUPM), which in outline covers about 9 areas, as follows:

a. Authority to issue business licenses for stock exchanges and supporting institutions

b. Authority to issue individual licenses for deputy underwriters, deputy broker-dealers, and deputy investment managers.

c. Authority to approve the establishment of a custodian bank

d. The authority to approve the nomination and dismissal of commissioners, directors, and appoint temporary management of stock exchanges, clearing and guarantee institutions, depository and settlement institutions until new commissioners and directors are elected.

e. The authority to examine and investigate each party in the event of a violation of the Capital Markets Law.

f. The authority to freeze or cancel the listing of certain securities

g. Authority to stop stock exchange transactions on certain securities

h. The authority to stop stock exchange trading activities in an emergency

i. The authority to act as an appeal institution for parties sanctioned by the stock exchange and clearing and guarantee institutions.
