= J Trust Bank =

Indonesian bank

PT Bank JTrust Indonesia Tbk
- Type: Public
- Traded as: IDX: BCIC
- Industry: Banking
- Predecessors: Bank CIC Internasional; Bank Danpac; Bank Pikko; CenturyBank; MutiaraBank
- Founded: 29 May 2015; 11 years ago
- Headquarters: Jakarta, Indonesia
- Website: www.jtrustbank.co.id

PT Bank JTrust Indonesia Tbk (IDX: BCIC) is an Indonesian bank founded in 2015. The bank is based in Jakarta.

== History ==
J Trust Co., Ltd. (J Trust), a holding company with the global scope of operations is located in Toranomon First Garden, 1-7-12 Toranomon, Minato-ku, Tokyo 105-0001. The company was selected as the winner among 11 applicants in the divestment of Bank Mutiara (formerly Bank Century, which was subject of a controversial bailout in 2008) which previously was under the control of the Indonesia Deposit Insurance Corporation (LPS).

After management restructuring as well as other recovery efforts, the bank was divested by LPS to J Trust Co., Ltd. The number of shares transferred at the time was 99% which was in compliance with the approval letter from The Indonesia Financial Services Authority (OJK) dated 20 November 2014 with value of Rp. 4.41 Trillion and Price to Book Value of around 3.5 times.

After becoming a controlling shareholder, J Trust supported some internal improvements at the bank and group consolidation. At The Extraordinary General Meeting of Shareholders dated 30 March 2015, the meeting approved the re-branding of Bank Mutiara to be J Trust Bank to be inline with other J Trust Group corporate identities in Japan, South Korea, and Singapore. After receiving approval from The Ministry of Law and Human Rights dated 7 April 2015 and OJK approval dated 21 May 2015, PT Bank JTrust Indonesia Tbk. is formally announced to the public at 29 May 2015.

== Leadership ==
=== Board of Commissioners ===
- President Commissioner: Nobiru Adachi
- Commissioner : Nobuiku Chiba
- Independent Commissioner: Benny Siswanto
- Independent Commissioner: Abdullah Firman Wibowo* (*effective following OJK's approval)

=== Board of directors ===
- President Director: Ritsuo Fukadai
- Vice President Director: Masayoshi Kobayashi
- Director : Felix I. Hartadi
- Director : Helmi A. Hidayat
- Director : Cho Won June
- Director : R. Djoko Prayitno
- Director : Widjaja Hendra

== Ownership ==
- J Trust Co., Ltd.: 72.23%
- J Trust Asia PTE Ltd.: 19.32%
- J Trust Investment Indonesia: 2.28%
- Public: 6.17%
