= Bank Tabungan Negara =

Indonesian banking company

PT Bank Tabungan Negara (Persero) Tbk
- Logo since 3 March 2024

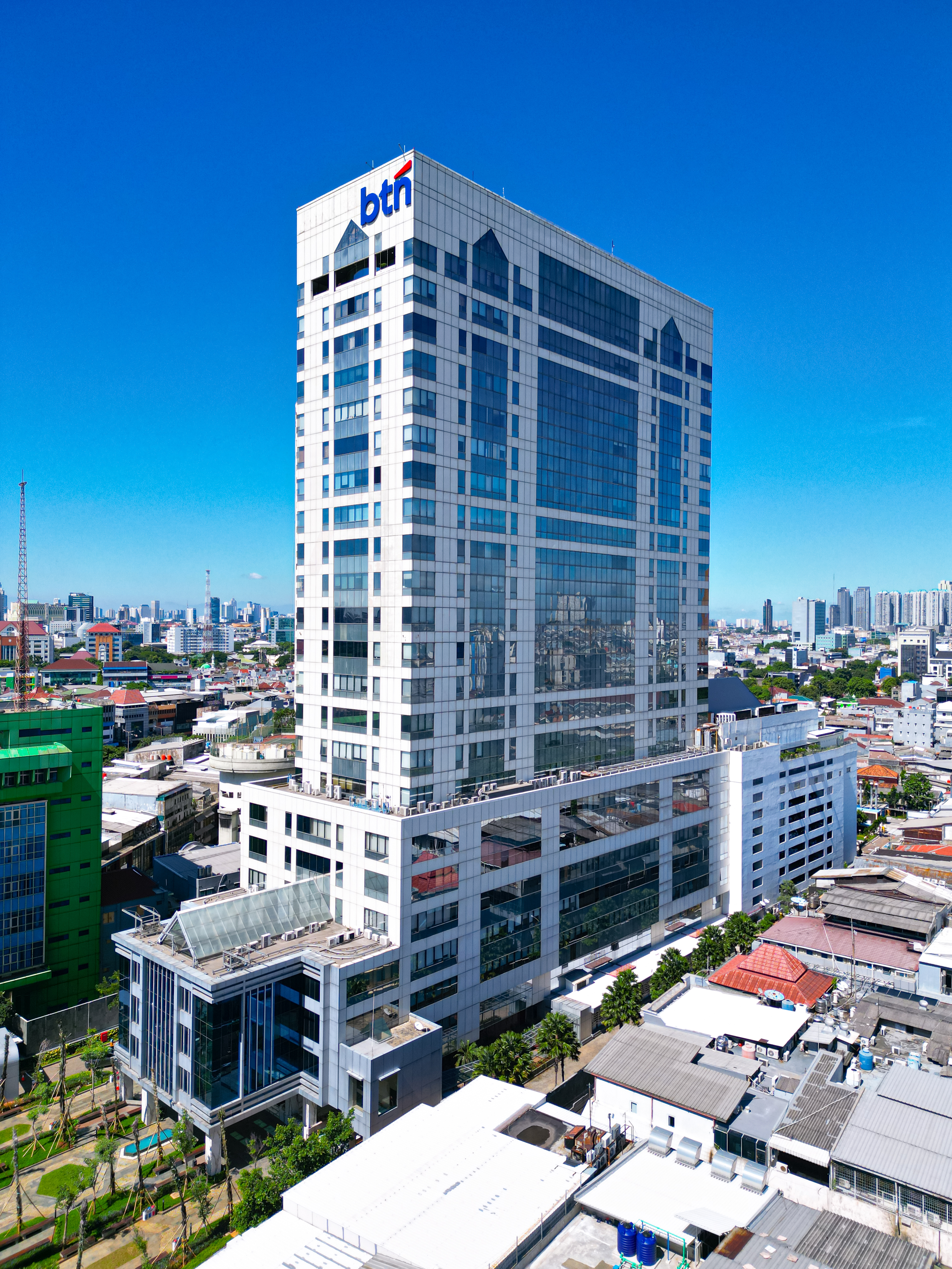
- BTN Tower (Menara BTN) in Jakarta
- Trade name: List: Bank BTN (1998–2024); BTN (2024–present)
- Type: Public
- Traded as: IDX: BBTN
- Industry: Finance and Banking
- Founded: 1897; 129 years ago (as Postspaarbank); 9 February 1950; 76 years ago (official founding date)
- Founder: Government of the Dutch East Indies
- Headquarters: Menara BTN, Gambir, Jakarta, Indonesia
- Key people: Nixon Napitupulu (President Director); Suryo Utomo (President Commissioner)
- Products: List: Loans mortgages investments debit cards credit cards Sharia banking
- Revenue: ▼ Rp 13.430 trillion (2023)
- Operating income: ▲ Rp 4,538 trillion (2023)
- Net income: ▲ Rp 3.5 trillion (2023)
- Total assets: ▲ Rp 439 trillion (2023)
- Total equity: ▲ Rp 30,479 trillion (2023)
- Owner: Danantara Asset Management (60%)
- Number of employees: ▲12.045 (2023)
- Website: www.btn.co.id

PT Bank Tabungan Negara (Persero) Tbk (lit. 'State Savings Bank (State-owned) plc'), abbreviated and trading as BTN (currently stylized in all-lowercase logo), is an Indonesian commercial bank best known as a mortgage bank, headquartered in Gambir, Jakarta.

Founded in 1897 by the government of the Dutch East Indies as a post office savings bank, its products include banks accounts (savings, current, and fixed deposit), loans (personal, business, and mortgage loans—the latter being its most popular offering since its introduction in the 1970s) and Sharia-compliant banking services.

== History ==
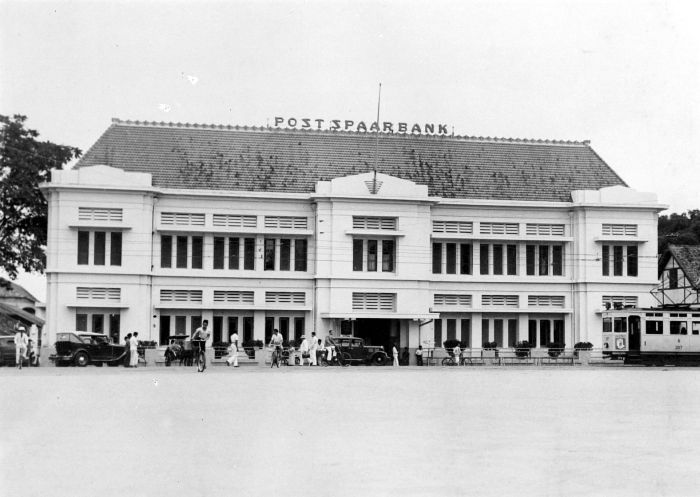
Postspaarbank building in Batavia (1938)

Bank Tabungan Negara was established in 1897 as a postal savings bank under the name Postspaarbank, with its headquarters located in Batavia. During the Japanese occupation of Indonesia, the bank was frozen and replaced with the Savings Office (Japanese: 貯金局, Hepburn: Chokin-kyoku; Nihon-shiki: Tyokin-kyoku) After the proclamation of Indonesian independence, the bank was taken over by the Indonesian government on 9 February 1950 under the Emergency Law No.9 and renamed Bank Tabungan Pos (Postal Savings Bank). In 1963 the bank's current name, Bank Tabungan Negara, was adopted. Bank BTN became the first bank to be appointed by the government to provide housing finance and mortgages to lower and middle income individuals.

The bank underwent a corporate restructure in 2003, which was followed by an initial public offering (IPO) in 2009 that led to the listing of Bank BTN on the Indonesia Stock Exchange. The IPO was ranked as Indonesia's largest IPO as of 2009.

== Logo history ==
The previous logo of Bank Tabungan Negara (BTN) consists of two main elements, namely logogram and logotype. The BTN logogram is a picture of a house which symbolizes a dream home. The previous BTN logotype consists of the words "BTN" using a sans-serif font and "Bank" in italic roman font.

BTN officially introduced the new logo to the public through its 74th anniversary celebration on 3 March 2024 at Indonesia Arena, Gelora Bung Karno Sports Complex, Jakarta.

BTN's previous logo used from 1980s until 1992

BTN's previous logo used from 1992 to 1998

BTN's first version of the previous logo in form of "Bank BTN" used from 1998 until 2008

BTN's second version of the previous logo in form of "Bank BTN" used from 2008 until 3 March 2024

BTN's current logo used since 3 March 2024

== Operations ==
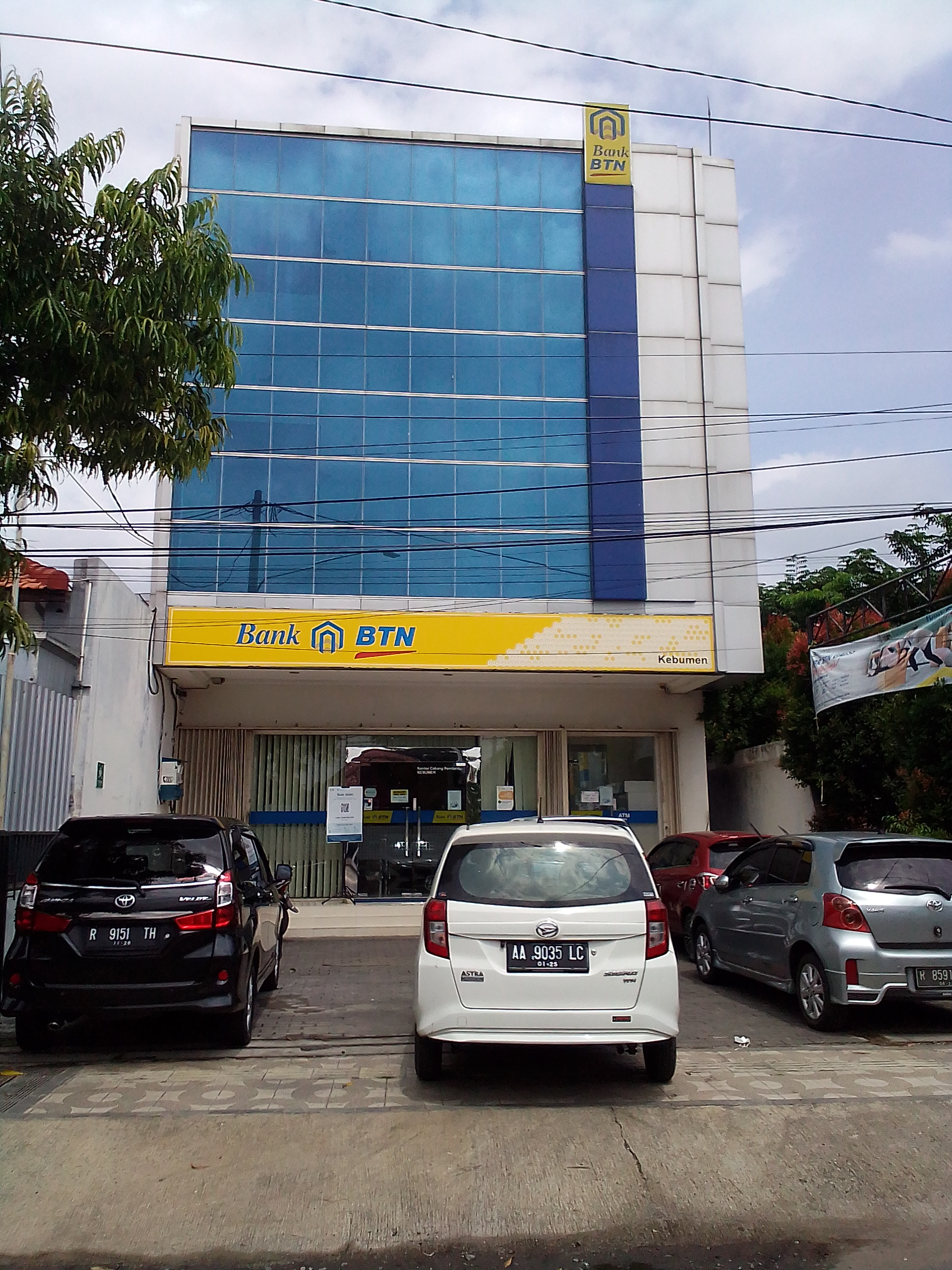
BTN building in Kebumen, Central Java

Bank Tabungan Negara's operations are divided into six regions; Sumatera, Java, Bali & Nusa Tenggara, Kalimantan, Sulawesi, and Papua & Maluku. As of December 2014, these regions gave the bank a total of 820 branches, 2,951 post office access points, and 1,830 ATMs, served by 8,582 employees.

== Ownership ==
The stock of Bank Tabungan Negara is listed on the Indonesia Stock Exchange, where it trades under the symbol BBTN. As of 31 December 2014, shareholding in the bank's stock was as indicated in the table below:

Bank Tabungan Negara Stock Ownership
Rank	Name of Owner	Percentage Ownership
1	Government of the Republic of Indonesia	60.13
2	Public, via the Indonesia Stock Exchange	38.75
3	Employee stock ownership plan	1.12
	Total	100.00

Due to being majority held by the Indonesian government, Bank Tabungan Negara is considered to be one of the four state owned banks in Indonesia.

== Governance ==
As of the Annual General Shareholders Meeting on 26 March 2025, Bank Tabungan Negara (BTN) announced a reorganization of its board of directors and commissioners.

Board of Commissioners

- Commissioner President/Independent: Suryo Utomo
- Vice Commissioner President/Independent: Dwi Ary Purnomo
- Independent Commissioners: Ida Nuryanti, Pietra Machreza Paloh, Panangian Simanungkalit
- Commissioners: Fahri Hamzah

Board of Directors

- President Director: Nixon L.P. Napitupulu
- Vice President Director: Oni Febrianto Rahardjo
- Director of Information Technology: Tan Jacky Chen
- Director of Treasury & International Banking: Venda Yuniarti
- Director of Corporate Banking: Helmy Afisa Nugroho
- Director of Risk Management: Setiyo Wibowo
- Director of Consumer Banking: Hirwandi Gafar
- Director of Finance & Strategy: Nofry Roni Poetra
- Director of Human Capital & Compliance: Eko Waluyo
- Director of Operations: I Nyoman Sugiri Yasa
- Director of Network and Retail Funding: Rully Setiawan
- Director of Commercial Banking: Hermita

Sharia Supervisory Board

- Chairman: Prof. Dr. H. Muhammad Quraish Shihab, MA
- Members: H. Mohammad Bagus Teguh Perwira, Lc, H. Muhammad Faiz, Lc, MA

== See also ==
- List of banks in Indonesia
- Financial Services Authority of Indonesia
