= OCBC Indonesia =

Indonesia-based bank

PT Bank OCBC NISP Tbk
- Trade name: OCBC Indonesia
- Formerly: NV Nederlandsch Indische Spaar En Deposito Bank (1941–1981); Bank NISP (1981–2008); OCBC NISP (2008–2023)
- Company type: Public
- Traded as: IDX: NISP
- Industry: Financial services
- Founded: Bandung, Indonesia (1941; 85 years ago)
- Founders: Liem Khe Tjie, Karmaka Surjaudaja (Kwee Tjie Hoei)
- Headquarters: OCBC NISP Tower, South Jakarta, Indonesia
- Area served: Indonesia
- Key people: Parwati Surjaudaja, President Director and CEO
- Products: Consumer banking corporate banking Retail banking
- Operating income: Rp10.6 Triliun (2022)
- Net income: Rp3.3 Triliun (2022)
- Total assets: Rp238.5 trilliun (2022)
- Total equity: Rp34.2 trilliun (2022)
- Owner: OCBC Bank (85.1%)
- Number of employees: 5,819 (2022) ▲
- Website: www.ocbc.id

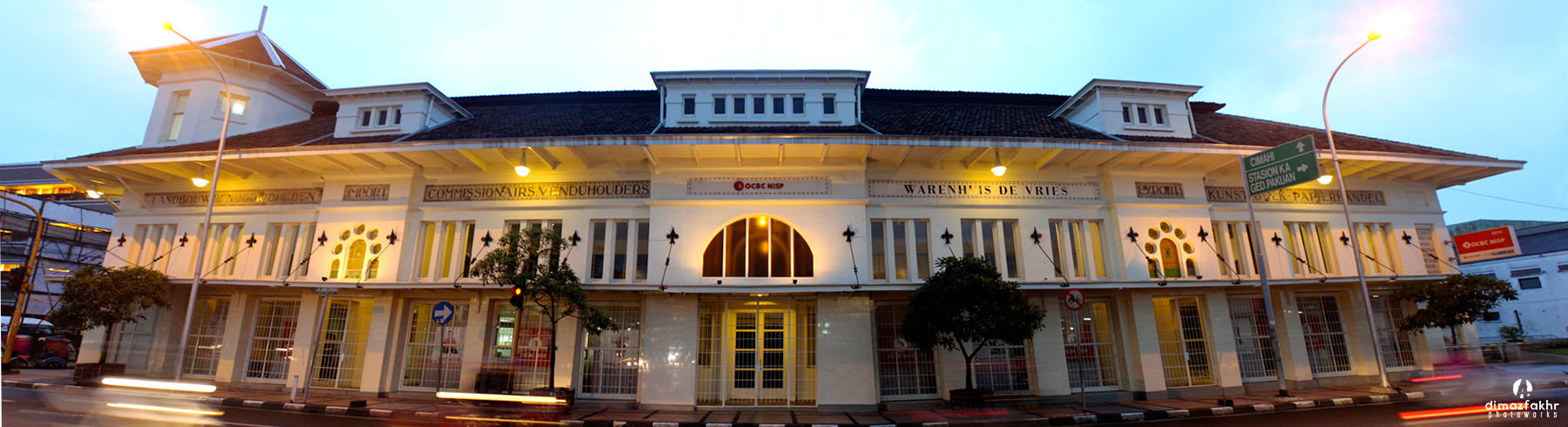
OCBC NISP branch in Bandung

PT Bank OCBC NISP Tbk (formerly Bank NISP), trading as OCBC Indonesia, is an Indonesian publicly listed banking and financial services company headquartered in South Jakarta, Indonesia. The bank is owned by Singaporean banking and financial group, OCBC Bank, which holds 85.1% of shares. OCBC is Indonesia's 8th largest bank by assets and has 337 branches and offices and 780 ATMs located across the country.

== History ==
Established in 1941, the bank was founded as NV Nederlandsch Indische Spaar en Deposito Bank ("Netherlands Indies Savings and Deposito Bank") in Bandung, then Dutch East Indies. The bank was one of the largest savings bank at the time of establishment and in 1967, it became a commercial bank providing corporate banking services as well. In 1981, the bank was then renamed to PT Bank Nilai Inti Sari Penyimpan (Bank NISP). It was among the first banks in Indonesia selected to channel government subsidized credits, to participate in government saving programs, and to issue bank guarantees for government projects. In 1972, Bank NISP entered into a joint agreement with Daiwa Perdania Bank, a joint venture between Daiwa Bank of Japan and Indonesian partners. Bank NISP later became a shareholder of Daiwa Perdania Bank. The bank subsequently became a licensed foreign exchange bank in 1990, and a publicly listed bank on the Indonesian Stock Exchange in 1994.

=== 1997 to 2008: Joint venture and acquisition by OCBC ===
In 1997, Bank NISP entered a joint venture with OCBC Indonesia, with the opening of PT Bank OCBC-NISP, with an initial paid-up capital of 150 billion rupiah. Since then, OCBC has been buying shares from shareholders within the bank and also from President Director and CEO, Parwati Surjaudaja, who sold 22.5% of her shares to OCBC in 2004. By 2008, OCBC Bank had become the main shareholder in Bank NISP and the bank was renamed Bank OCBC NISP.

=== 2010 to present: Merger with OCBC Indonesia ===
OCBC NISP logo used until November 14, 2023

In 2011, OCBC NISP merged with OCBC Indonesia, where OCBC Indonesia was dissolved without going through liquidation. The combined entity would operate under the name of Bank OCBC NISP, and a total of Rp 47.6 trillion in combined assets after the merger.

Marking the start of the new banking journey, Bank OCBC NISP used "OCBC" as a new brand name and logo, effective November 14, 2023.

PT Bank OCBC NISP Tbk (“OCBC Indonesia”) on November 16, 2023, entered into a Sale and Purchase Agreement (“SPA”) with Commonwealth Bank of Australia (“CBA”) to acquire 99.0% of the shares in PT Bank Commonwealth (“PTBC”) from CBA (the “Proposed Acquisition”). OCBC Indonesia also intends to acquire the remaining 1.00% shares of PTBC from the other shareholders. The proposed acquisition is subject to regulatory approvals from Financial Services Authority of Indonesia (Otoritas Jasa Keuangan), Annual General Meeting of Shareholders (AGMS) and satisfaction of certain other conditions. Following completion of the acquisition, PTBC will be integrated into OCBC Indonesia.

== Banking services ==
=== Individual Customers ===
- Saving
- Consumer credit
- Credit card
- Bancassurance
- Mutual funds
- Premier Service
- Private banking services
- Trust service
- Electronic banking services

=== Business Customers ===
- Cash management
- Productive financing
- Trade finance
- Trust services
- Electronic banking services

=== Treasury ===
- Foreign exchange and derivatives
- Debt securities
- Interest rate derivatives
- Structured product

=== Sharia Banking ===
- Sharia funding
- Sharia retail financing
- Sharia productive financing
- Sharia Bancassurance

== Management structure ==
=== Board of Commissioners ===
- President Commissioner : Pramukti Surjaudaja
- Commissioner : Helen Wong
- Commissioner : Lai Teck Poh
- Commissioner : Na Wu Beng
- Independent Commissioner : Jusuf Halim
- Independent Commissioner : Nicholas Tan
- Independent Commissioner : Betti S. Alisjahbana
- Independent Commissioner : Rama P. Kusumaputra

=== Board of directors ===
- President Director : Parwati Surjaudaja
- Director : Emilya Tjahjadi
- Director : Hartati
- Director : Martin Widjaja
- Director : Andrae Krishnawan W.
- Director : Johannes Husin
- Director : Joseph Chan Fook Onn
- Director : Lili S. Budiana
- Director : The Ka Jit

=== Sharia Supervisory Board ===
- Chairperson : Muhammad Anwar Ibrahim
- Member : Mohammad Bagus Teguh Perwira

== See also ==
- List of banks in Indonesia
- Oversea-Chinese Banking Corporation
