= Bank Rakyat Indonesia =

Indonesian public bank

PT Bank Rakyat Indonesia (Persero) Tbk
- Logo used since 16 October 2025

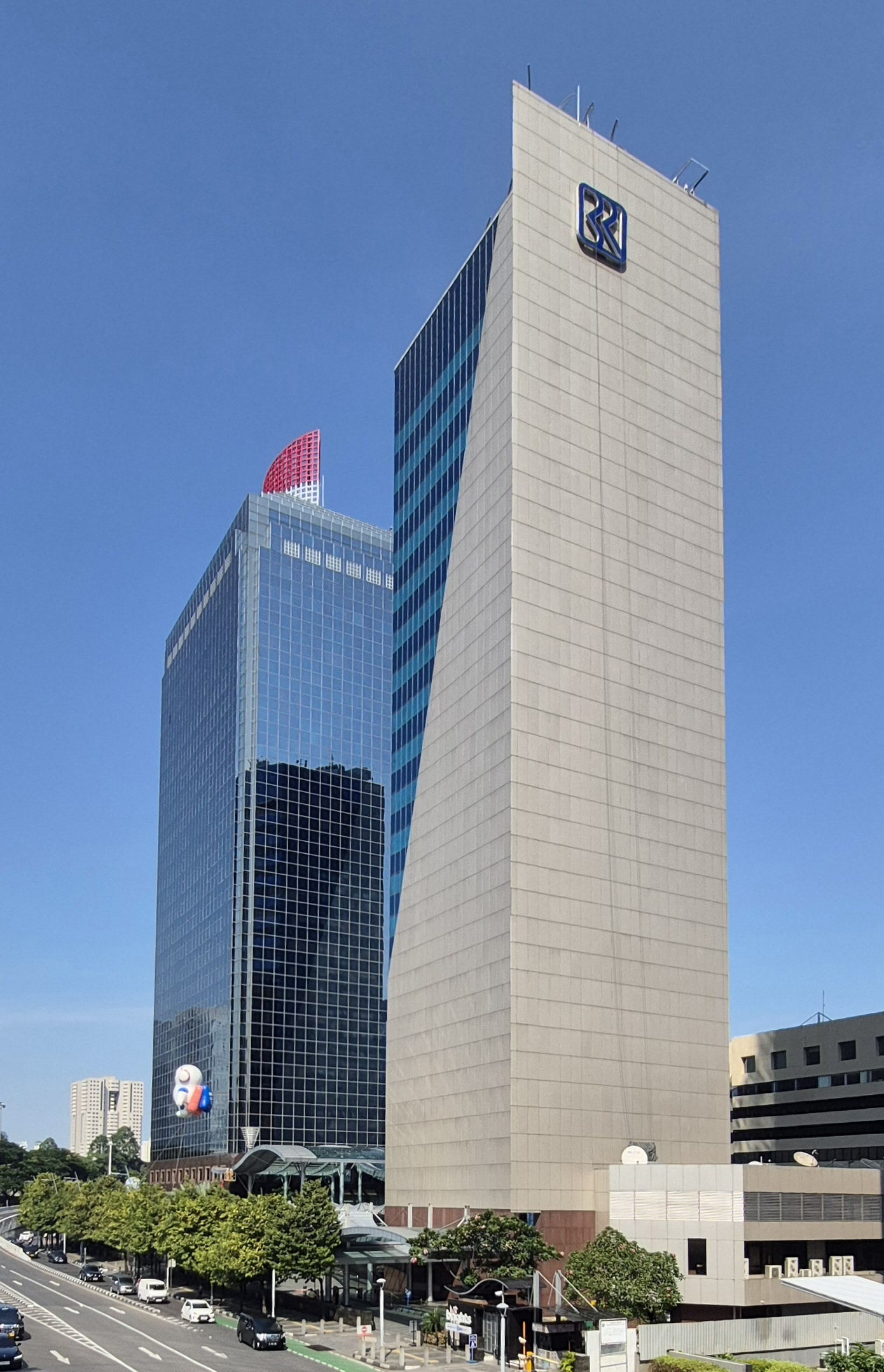
- BRI I and II Buildings, the headquarters of BRI
- Type: Public
- Traded as: IDX: BBRI
- Industry: Financial services, microfinance
- Founded: 16 December 1895; 130 years ago in Purwokerto, Central Java
- Founder: Raden Bei Aria Wirjaatmadja (as Purwokertoan Savings and Loan Bank of Native Nobility); Government of Indonesia (as Bank Rakyat Indonesia)
- Headquarters: Jakarta, Indonesia
- Key people: Hery Gunardi (President Director); Kartika Wirjoatmodjo (President Commissioner)
- Revenue: ▲ Rp 207.78 trillion (2025)
- Operating income: ▼ Rp 73,247 trillion (2025)
- Net income: ▼ Rp 57,13 trillion (2025)
- Total assets: ▲ Rp 2,135.37 trillion (2025)
- Total equity: ▲ Rp 330.19 trillion (2025)
- Owner: Danantara Asset Management (52.66%); State-Owned Enterprises Regulatory Agency (0.53%)
- Number of employees: 84,949 (2025)
- Subsidiaries: Permodalan Nasional Madani; Pegadaian; Bank Raya Indonesia; Bank Syariah Indonesia (15.38%); BRI Insurance; BRI Life; BRI Remittance; BRI Danareksa Sekuritas; BRI Ventures; BRI Manajemen Investasi
- Website: www.bri.co.id/en/home

PT Bank Rakyat Indonesia (Persero) Tbk (lit. "Indonesian People's Bank"), commonly known as Bank BRI or just BRI, is one of the largest banks in Indonesia. It specialises in small scale and microfinance style borrowing from and lending to its approximately 30 million retail clients through its over 8,600 branches, units and rural service posts. It also has a comparatively small, but growing, corporate business. As of 2022, it is the second largest bank in Indonesia by asset.

BRI is the oldest bank in Indonesia, tracing back since 1895. It is currently 53% owned by the government (Persero) and has been wholly state-owned for the entire period since the war of independence (1945 to 1949) to November 2003, when 30% of its shares were sold through an IPO.

== History ==
Flag of BRI

BRI was founded in 1895, during the Dutch colonial period as De Poerwokertosche Hulp en Spaarbank der Inlandsche Hoofden (lit. 'Help and Savings Bank for Purwokerto's Aristocrats') by Raden Bei Aria Wirjaatmadja in Purwokerto, Central Java. It then underwent its first (of many) name changes to Hulp en Spaarbank der Inlandsche Bestuurs Ambtenaren (Help and Savings Bank for Local Civil Servants). Going through several name changes, its final name during the colonial period was Algemene Volkscredietbank (People's General Credit Bank, AVB) in 1934. This translates loosely into Indonesian as Bank Rakyat Serikat. At this point, it was one of the largest institutions in the (then) colony. The bank's operations were affected by the Japanese occupation during the 1942 to 1945 period of World War II, including a further name change to People's Bank (Japanese: 庶民銀行 (Hepburn: shominginkō, Kunrei-shiki: Syomin Ginkoo), Indonesian: Bank Rakjat (old spelling, current spelling: Bank Rakyat)). After the Indonesian declaration of independence, on 17 August 1945 the bank was officially nationalised by the new government and then renamed Bank Rakyat Indonesia Serikat. BRI gained its current name and limited company status in 1992.

Since then, BRI has been concentrating on increasing its core business and improving its risk management practices. As part of the reformasi (reform) process in Indonesia since 1998, the government has been steadily reducing its influence on the bank's day-to-day operations, culminating in its IPO. It is also seeking to comply with the Basel II accords, as mandated by Bank Indonesia, by 2008.

During the period of 2006–2011, its assets jumped almost 62%. The bank topped the list of the nation's most profitable banks for six years, recording assets of Rp 249.56 trillion (US$28.6 billion) in 2010, up from Rp 154.72 trillion in 2006.

On 16 October 2025, coinciding with the kick-off of BRI's 130th anniversary celebration, BRI unveiled a soft-launch of the new logo in which "Bank Rakyat Indonesia" wordmark in Inter Display typeface (a variant of Inter which would later become the official corporate font) were placed under the updated BRI logo written in a modified variant of AU Passata typeface, introduce Nusantara Blue, Cakrawala Blue, and Mentari Blue as the new official colours, and Satu Bank Untuk Semua (lit. 'One Bank for All') as BRI's new corporate slogan. The new logo and slogan were then officially introduced on 16 December 2025, during the launch of the new corporate rebranding for almost all subsidiaries and services under BRI Group (with exception of Pegadaian, Permodalan Nasional Madani, and Bank Raya Indonesia). During the corporate rebranding, he BRI monogram was modified for the first time since 1985.

On 30 December 2025, BRI signed an agreement with F.C. Barcelona to become the Official Commercial Banking Partner of the club in Indonesia, which is in effect until 31 December 2027. As part of its sponsorship, a special edition of BRI Debit Card was unveiled on 14 February 2026 at Kasablanka Mall.

On 8 April 2026, BRI became the first bank in Indonesia to receive ISO/IEC 25001:2014 certificate regarding planning management of Systems and software Quality Requirements and Evaluation (SQuaRE).

On 25 May 2026, as part of digital transformation, BRI soft launched a new application designed to be a future replacement of BRImo, namely Qita by BRI. The new application name was derived from Indonesian slang word meaning Kita (lit. 'Our').

== Offices worldwide ==
- BRI New York Agency
- BRI Singapore Branch
- BRI Hong Kong Representative Office
- BRI Cayman Island Branch
- BRI Timor Leste Branch
- BRI Taipei Branch

== Gallery ==
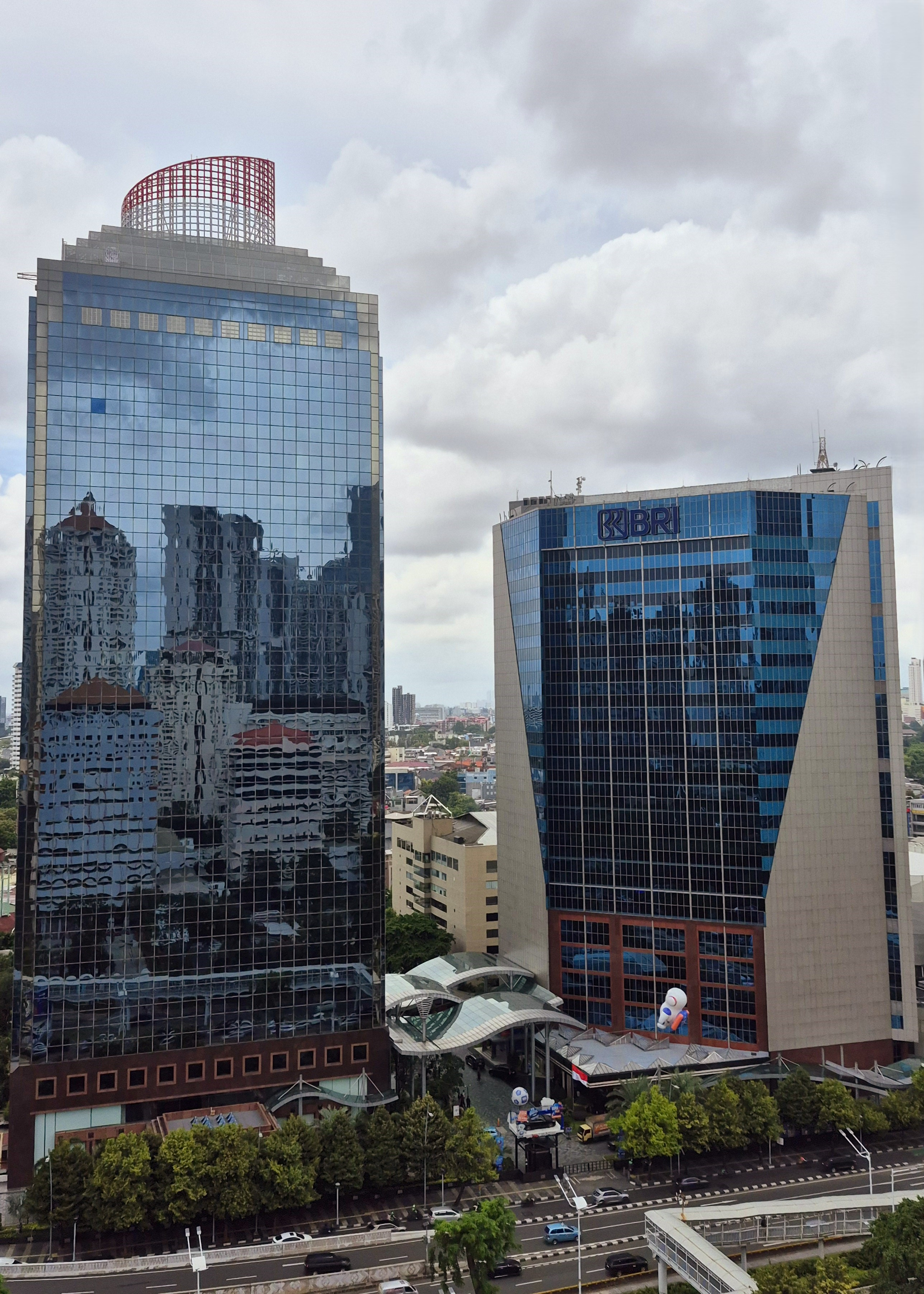
BRI Headquarters in Central Jakarta

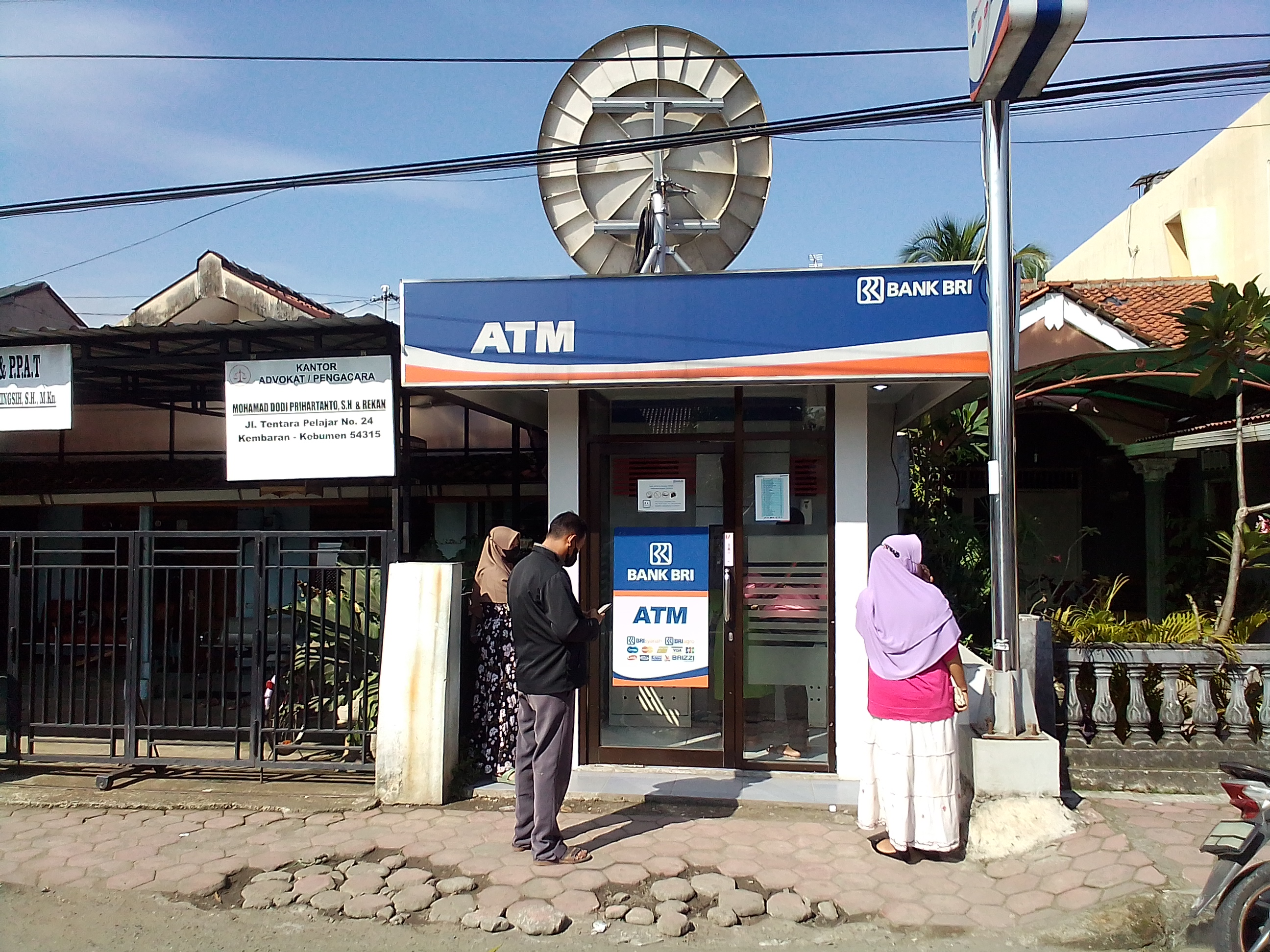
ATM BRI

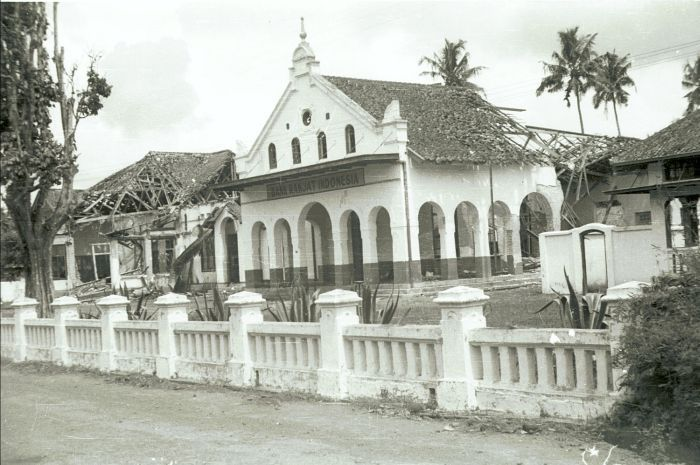
One of BRI's branch office (1947)

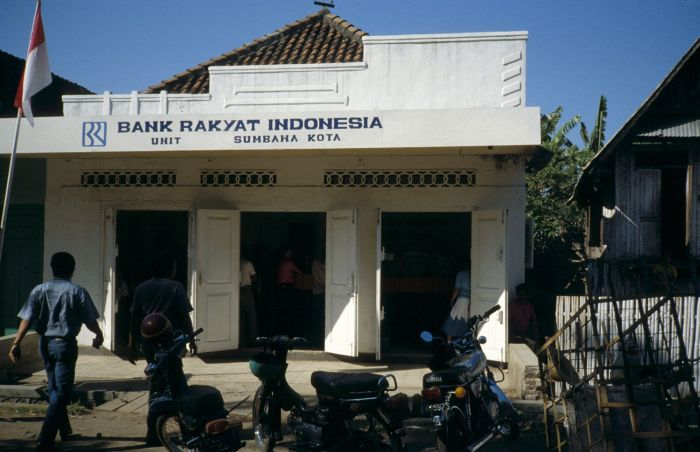
BRI Sumbawa branch (1988)

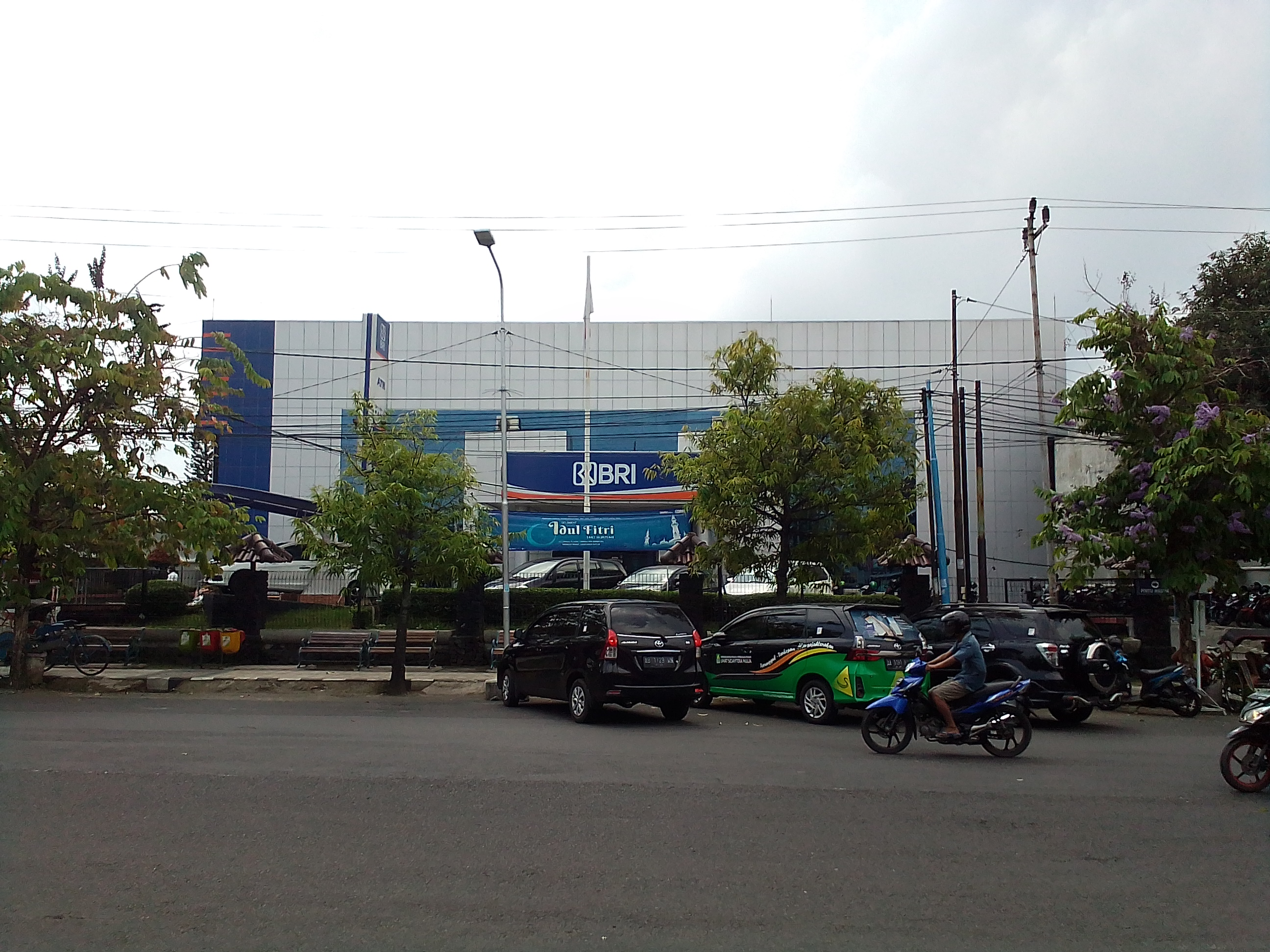
BRI Branch office in Kebumen, Central Java

=== Logo gallery ===
Logo used from 1951 until 1960

Logo used from 1968 until 1985

Logo used from 1985 to 2000

Logo used from 2000 to 2007, remained in use for unofficial purposes until 2025

Logo used from 2007 to December 2020

Logo used from December 2020 to 16 October 2025

Logo without "Bank Rakyat Indonesia" wordmark since 16 October 2025

Logo of BRI Group since 2026

BRI's slogan "Satu Bank Untuk Semua"

Service logos

BRImo

Qita by BRI

Qlola by BRI

BRILink Mobile

BRIZZI

BRI Prioritas

BRI Private

== Satellite ==
In April 2014, BRI contracted with Space Systems/Loral and Arianespace to, respectively, build and launch their first satellite, a 3,500 kg (7,700 lb) C-band and Ku-band spacecraft dubbed BRIsat, and on 18 June 2016, Ariane 5 has successfully launched BRIsat as the world's first satellite owned and operated by a bank to link the bank's geographically isolated branches.
