= Nurmala Kartini Sjahrir =

Indonesian politician

Her Excellency Nurmala Kartini Sjahrir
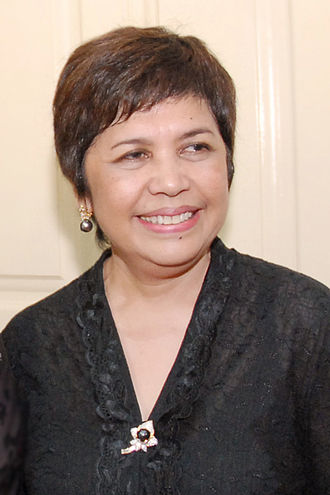

Indonesia Ambassador to Japan
- Incumbent
- Assumed office 19 December 2025
- President: Prabowo Subianto
- Preceded by: Heri Akhmadi

Indonesia Ambassador to Argentina
- In office 10 August 2010 – 15 October 2014
- President: Susilo Bambang Yudhoyono
- Preceded by: Sunten Manurung
- Succeeded by: Jonny Sinaga

Personal details
- Born: February 1, 1950 (age 76) Huta Namora of Silaen District, Toba Regency, Indonesia
- Party: New Indonesia Party of Struggle
- Spouse: Dr Sjahrir
- Children: Pandu Patria Sjahrir; Gita Rusminda Sjahrir
- Education: University of Indonesia (bachelor), Boston University (Master and Doctoral)
- Profession: Anthropologist, diplomat, lecturer

Nurmala Kartini Sjahrir (born Kartini Boru Pandjaitan, February 1, 1950) is an Indonesian anthropologist and diplomat who has served as Indonesian ambassador to Japan since December 2025. She also served as the Indonesian ambassador to Argentina, accredited to Paraguay and Uruguay from 2010 to 2014. She also served as the Indonesian representative to the advisory board of ASEAN-IPR as well as a former chairwoman of Asosiasi Antropologi Indonesia (Association of Indonesian Anthropology), abbreviated as AAI.

== Personal life ==
=== Early life ===
Kartini was born in a small hamlet of the Simargala Huta Namora, Silaen District of Toba Regency, North Sumatra, not far from Lake Toba. Her parents, Bonar Panjaitan and Farida Naiborhu were a conservative Toba Batak. They had five children, including Kartini the eldest amongst three daughters, the eldest son Luhut Binsar Panjaitan (the Coordinating Minister for Maritime and Investment Affairs of Indonesia), as well as three other siblings.

In 1950s, Panjaitan and Naiborhu moved to Pekanbaru, a capital of neighboring province of Riau because Panjaitan was given a job to work for PT. Caltex Pacific Indonesia now Chevron Corporation. They resided in Padang Bulan, Senapelan District. There Kartini was sent to study at the SMP 1 Pekanbaru, before admitted to St. Ursula Catholic School in Jakarta.

While at university, she was one of the love interests of activist Soe Hok Gie. Gie referred to her with the alias Sunarti in his book Catatan Harian Seorang Demonstran.

=== Marriage ===
On December 8, 1979, Kartini was married to Dr Sjahrir, one of central figures behind Malari incident. As Kartini is a Christian and her husband was a Muslim, they performed their marriage in front of pendeta (Christian priest) as well as a penghulu (Muslim chieftain). They have two children, Pandu Patria Sjahrir and Gita Rusminda Sjahrir.

== Education ==
She is an alumnus of famous Catholic boarding school (Indonesian: sekolah asrama) in Central Jakarta, St. Ursula Catholic School. In 1976 she graduated from University of Indonesia in 1976. During her study, Kartini joined and became a member of Mapala UI (her name is listed as Kartini Panjaitan Syahrir), one of University of Indonesia's most popular student organization that focused on adventure, mountaineering, and expedition. In 1975, a year before she graduated, Kartini was chosen as the organization's chairwoman.

She received a master's and doctoral degree from the graduate school of Boston University, respectively in 1981 and 1990.

== Career ==
Graduated from one of the most prestigious university in Indonesia, majoring anthropology, Kartini started her professional career as an assistant for Dr Melly Tan, one of senior researcher at LEKNAS (Lembaga Ekonomi dan Kemasyarakatan Nasional; National Institute of Economics and Society). Now LEKNAS was merged with LRKN (Lembaga Riset Kebudayaan Nasional: National Institute of Cultural Research) into PMB (Puslitbang Kemasyarakatan dan Kebudayaan) OF Indonesian Institute of Sciences.

Kartini was among the distinguished speakers of UN Human Rights Council Session 23 – Panel in Geneva, June 3, 2013, delivering talk about supporting gender politics in harmony on the prevention of domestic violence. On 22 September 2016, Indonesia participated in the International Conference on Sustainable Development (IC-SD) at Columbia University in New York. Kartini chaired the Indonesia Panel, held at the Faculty House of Columbia University.

Since 2019 Kartini is an independent commissioner, board member of PT Siloam Intl Hospita Tbk. She also works as a senior advisor on climate change to the Coordinating Minister for Maritime Affairs and participated as one of Indonesian delegations to the Conference of the Parties (Twenty-fifth session) which was held in Madrid, 2–13 December 2019.

Kartin was installed as ambassador to Japan on 19 December 2025 and presented her credentials to Emperor Naruhito on 18 August 2026.

== Awards ==
- Argentina:
  - Grand Cross of the Order of May - September 15, 2014

Diplomatic posts
Preceded by Sunten Zephyrimus Manurung	Ambassador of Indonesia to Argentina; 2010–2014	Succeeded by Jonny Sinaga
Preceded by Heri Akhmadi	Ambassador of Indonesia to Japan; 2025–present	Incumbent
