= Manurung =

Batak surname originating in Indonesia

Manurung is one of Toba Batak clans originating in North Sumatra, Indonesia. People of this clan bear the clan's name as their surname. Notable people of this clan include:

- Butet Manurung (born 1972), Indonesian social activist and anthropologist
- Leane Suniar Manurung (born 1948), Indonesian Olympic archer
- Martin Manurung (born 1978), Indonesian politician
- Sunten Manurung (born 1949), Indonesian diplomat
