= Indonesia Investment Authority =

Indonesian sovereign wealth fund

- Native name: Lembaga Pengelola Investasi
- Company type: Sovereign wealth fund
- Founded: February 2021; 5 years ago
- Headquarters: Prosperity Tower, Jakarta, Indonesia
- Key people: Ridha D. M. Wirakusumah (CEO)
- Revenue: ▲ Rp5.42 trillion (2023); Rp3.45 trillion (2022)
- Net income: ▲ Rp5.61 trillion (2022); Rp2.62 trillion (2022)
- Total assets: ▲ Rp118.87 trillion (2023); Rp99.85 trillion (2022)
- Total equity: ▲ Rp113.73 trillion (2023); Rp96.95 trillion (2022)
- Owner: Government of Indonesia
- Subsidiaries: PT Rafflesia Investasi Indonesia; PT Abhinaya Investasi Indonesia; PT Swarna Investasi Indonesia; PT Akar Investasi Indonesia; PT INA DP World
- Website: www.ina.go.id

The Indonesia Investment Authority (INA; Indonesian: Lembaga Pengelola Investasi, lit. 'Investment Management Agency', LPI) is one of two sovereign wealth funds of Indonesia, with the other being Danantara.

== History ==
The INA was launched in February 2021 as part of the Job Creation Law and is intended to attract investments, create jobs and to boost economic growth as well as to strengthen the country's economy by diversifying into new asset classes. It has a target of managing $24.5 billion of assets. Unlike sovereign wealth funds of other countries which manage excess oil revenues or foreign exchange reserves, the INA seeks foreign funds as co-investors to finance the country's economic development.

In 2022, INA became a Full Member of the International Forum of Sovereign Wealth Funds non profit organization. Also in 2022, INA founded its subsidiary PT Maleo Investai Indonesia. Other subsidiaries include PT Rafflesia Investasi Indonesia, PT Abhinaya Investasi Indonesia, PT INA DP World, PT Swarna Investasi Indonesia and PT Akar Investasi Indonesia.

In 2023, the fund's net profit increased 64.1% from the previous year to 4.30 trillion rupiah with the revenue increasing by 57.1% to 5.42 trillion rupiah.

== Budget ==
INA had received commitments of up to $10 billion prior to its launch from global companies and agencies such as the U.S. International Development Finance Corporation and the Japan Bank for International Cooperation, as well as a few foreign pension funds. The Indonesian government will support the fund with $5 billion in cash and other assets. The United Arab Emirates has announced a plan to invest $10 billion in INA. For the financing of infrastructure projects, an additional US$4.2 billion has been allocated and added to the fund in November 2021.

== Governance ==
INA reports directly to the President of Indonesia. The supervisory board is headed by the Finance Minister, the State Owned Enterprises Minister is also a member of the board.

== Investments ==
From its implementation in 2021 until June 2023, more than $3 billion in capital has been invested by the fund, such as the $800 million into Mitratel in a partnership with the Abu Dhabi Investment Authority, the Abu Dhabi Growth Fund and the GIC. The INA also invested $150 million into Kimia Farma together with the Silk Road Fund, as well as $500 million into Pertamina Geothermal Energy together with Masdar and $300 million into Traveloka. The INA signed an investment pact in April 2022 for the development of toll roads located on Java and Sumatra. In June 2023, the INA partnered with MCUDI and ESR Group for investments into three logistic parks in Indonesia. According to Ministry of Foreign Affairs of Indonesia, INA has reached agreement with DP World from United Arab Emirates to develop and improve the infrastructures of Port of Belawan, Medan, in June 2023. This cooperation also involved Prima Terminal Petikemas Ltd, a subsidiary of Pelindo. The INA acquired two Trans-Sumatra Toll Road portions for 12.5 trillion rupiah from PT Hutama Karya in July 2023.

The INA allocated 20% of its total investments into the new renewable energy sector in November 2023. In October 2024, the INA invested into two toll-road sections, bringing its new assets to about $1.4 billion.

== See also ==
- Economy of Indonesia
