= Pos Indonesia =

Indonesian state-owned company

PT Pos Indonesia (Persero)

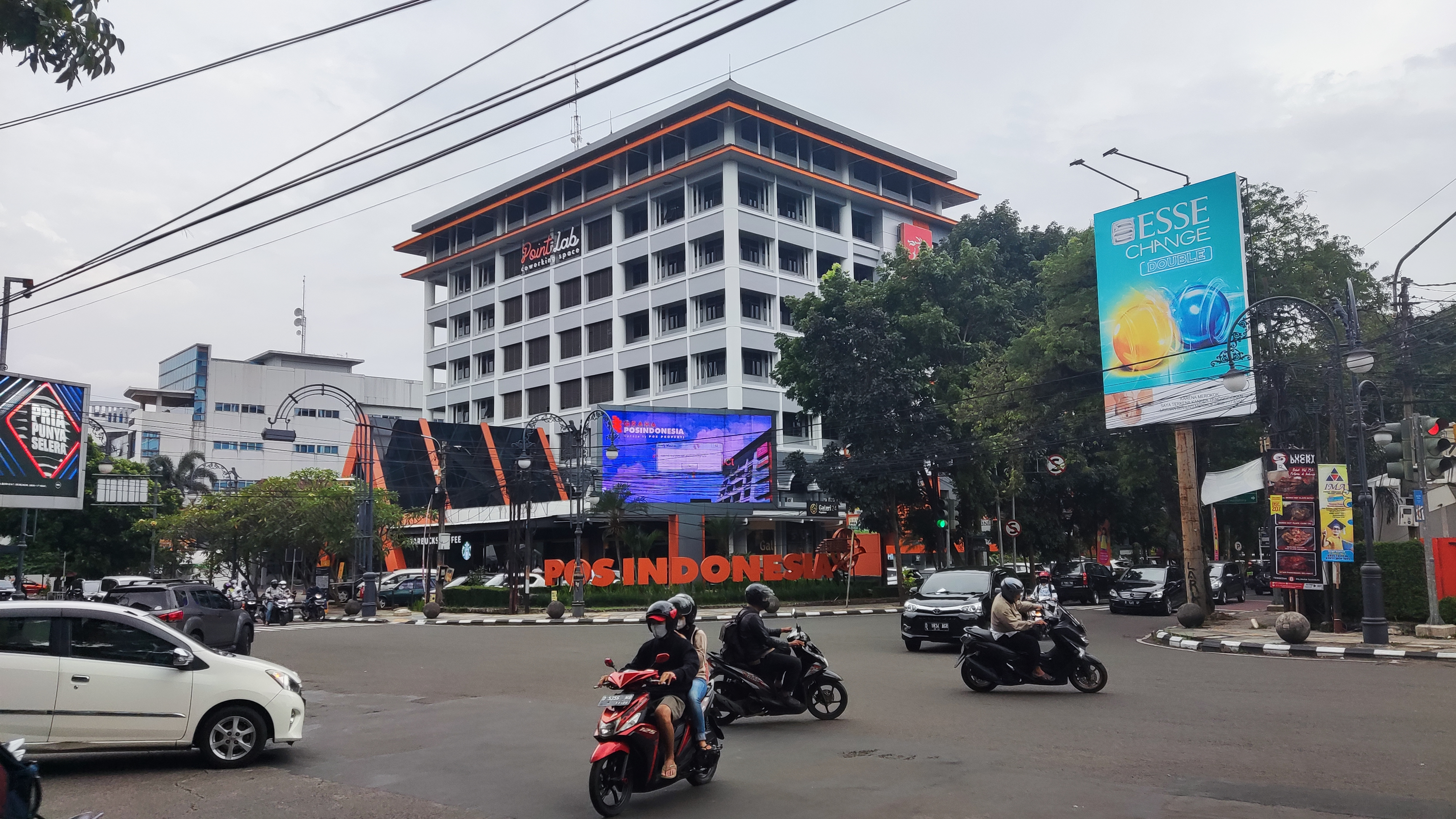
- Headquarters in Bandung
- Trade name: POS IND Logistik Indonesia, POS IND
- Formerly: Perusahaan Negara Pos dan Giro (1965–78); Perusahaan Umum Pos dan Giro (Posts and Currents Public Corporation) (1978–95)
- Company type: State-owned perseroan terbatas
- Predecessor: Perusahaan Negara Pos dan Telekomunikasi (1961–65)
- Founded: 26 August 1746; 279 years ago 1995 (current form)
- Headquarters: Graha Pos Indonesia, Bandung, Indonesia
- Area served: Indonesia
- Key people: Faizal Rochmad Djoemadi, CEO
- Services: Mail and logistics
- Revenue: ▲ Rp 5.01 trillion (2016)
- Net income: ▲ Rp 204.1 billion (2016)
- Total assets: ▲ Rp 5.19 trillion (2016)
- Total equity: ▲ Rp 1.05 trillion (2016)
- Owner: Government of Indonesia
- Number of employees: 23,825 (2016)
- Parent: Danantara Asset Management
- Website: posindonesia.co.id

PT Pos Indonesia (Persero) (trading as POS IND Logistik Indonesia or POS IND since 2023) is the state-owned company responsible for providing postal service in Indonesia. It was established with the current structure in 1995 and now operates 11 regional divisions.

== History ==
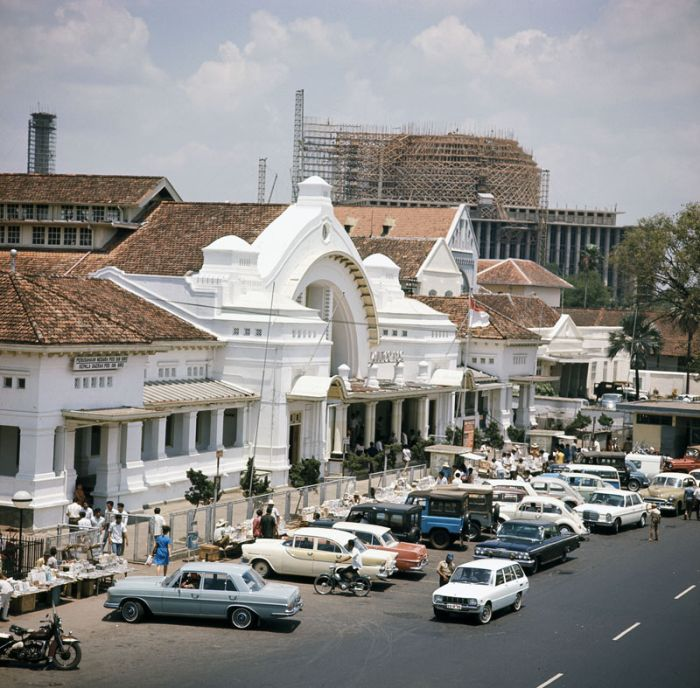
Jakarta regional post office, 1971

Primary logo of Pos Indonesia used until August 2023, still used as the secondary logo until 16 November of that year.

Postal service in colonial Dutch East Indies was provided by the Post, Telegraph, and Telephone Service (Dutch: Post-, Telegraaf-, en Telefoondienst, PTT), established in 1906. On 27 September 1945, following the proclamation of Indonesia's independence, the central PTT office in Bandung was seized from occupying Japanese forces. It became a state-owned company in 1961 and then split in 1965 to form two separate companies, one providing telecommunication services (eventually becoming Telkom Indonesia) and the other mail and currents or giro. The new mail services company was reorganized in 1978. A government decree came into effect on 6 June 1995 to create the current Pos Indonesia.

== Organization ==
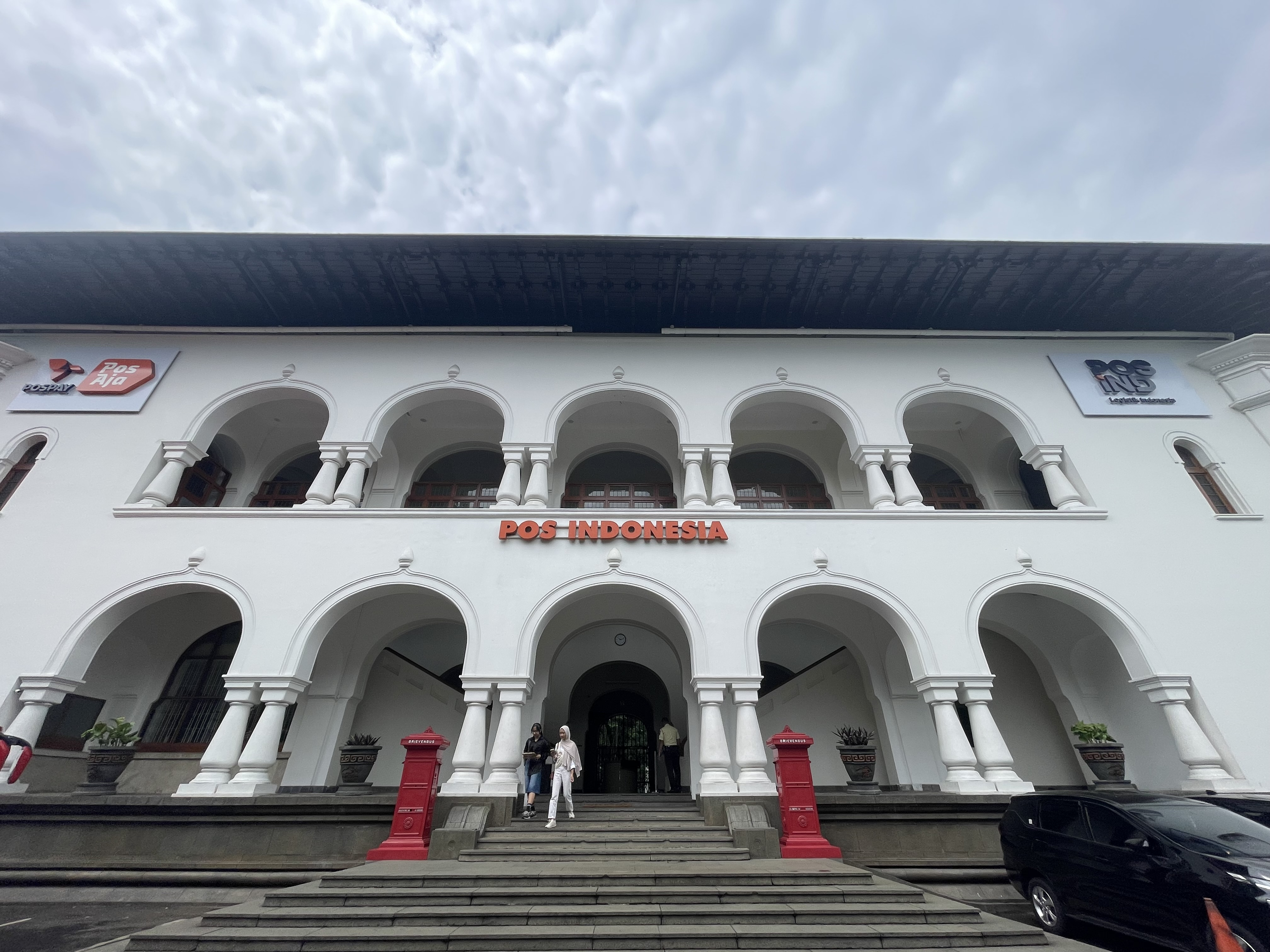
Former headquarters of Pos Indonesia in Bandung; built simultaneously with Gedung Sate

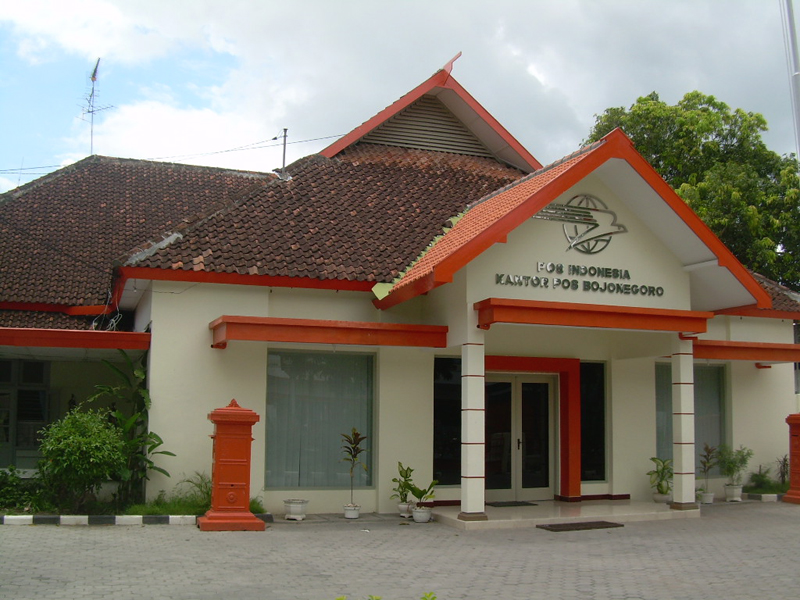
Post office in Bojonegoro, East Java

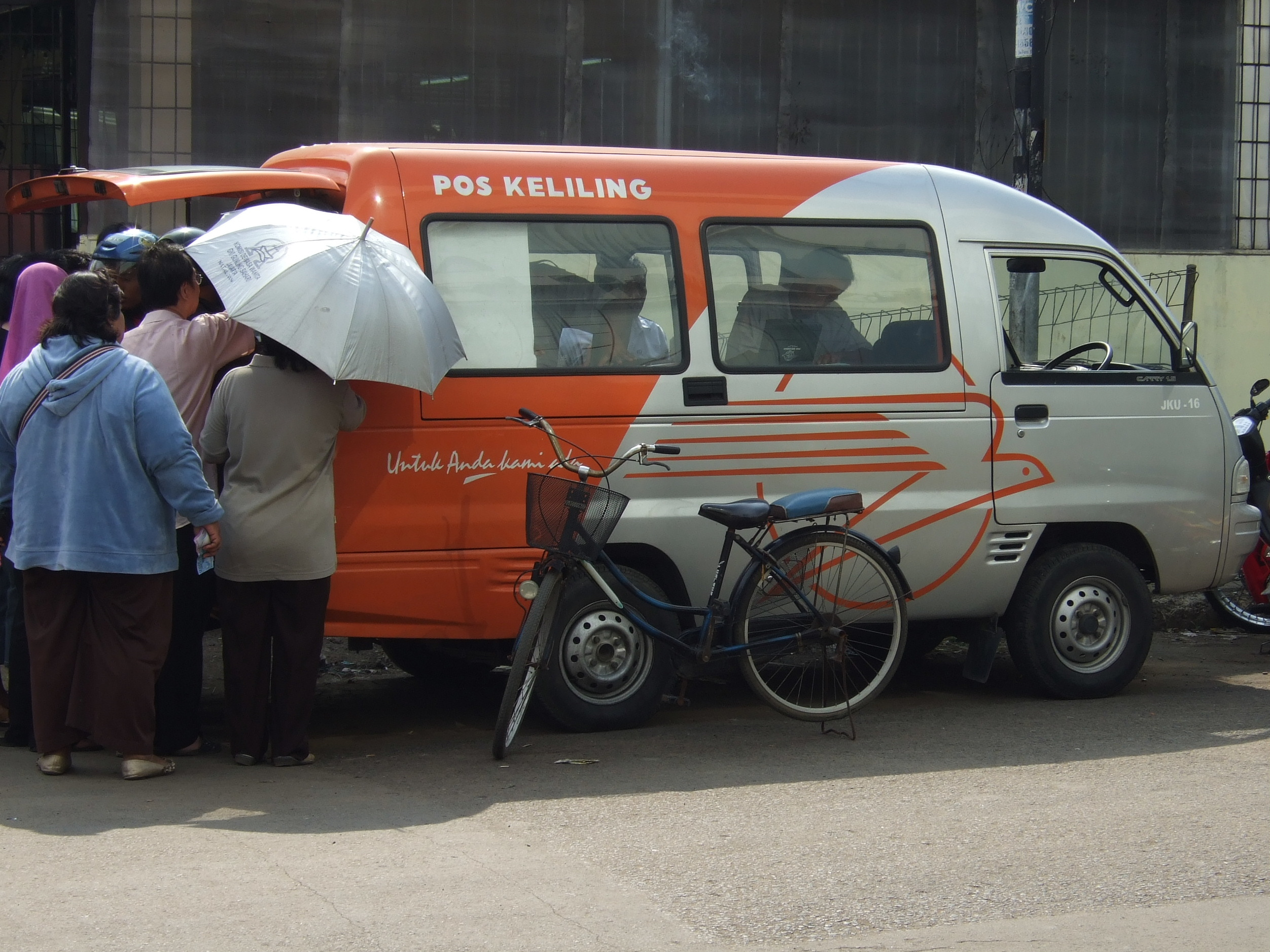
Pos Indonesia's mobile post office

Pos Indonesia operates in 11 regional divisions across the country, each covering multiple provinces. Each region operates several hundred inner city, outer city, and remote locations. There are 3,700 post offices nationwide with 3,190 post offices providing money transfer services in co-operation with Western Union.

- Region I (Medan branch): Aceh, North Sumatra
- Region II (Padang branch): Riau, Riau Islands, West Sumatra
- Region III (Palembang branch): Bengkulu, Jambi, South Sumatra, Bangka–Belitung Islands, Lampung
- Region IV (Jakarta branch): Banten, Jakarta, West Java
- Region V (Bandung branch): Banten, West Java
- Region VI (Semarang branch): Central Java, Yogyakarta
- Region VII (Surabaya branch): East Java
- Region VIII (Denpasar branch): Bali, West Nusa Tenggara, East Nusa Tenggara
- Region IX (Banjarbaru branch): West Kalimantan, Central Kalimantan, East Kalimantan, South Kalimantan
- Region X (Makassar branch): North Sulawesi, Gorontalo, Central Sulawesi, West Sulawesi, South Sulawesi, Southeast Sulawesi
- Region XI (Jayapura branch): North Maluku, Maluku, West Papua, Southwest Papua, Papua, South Papua, Highland Papua

== See also ==
- Postal codes in Indonesia
