= KRI John Lie =

Bung Tomo-class corvette of Indonesia

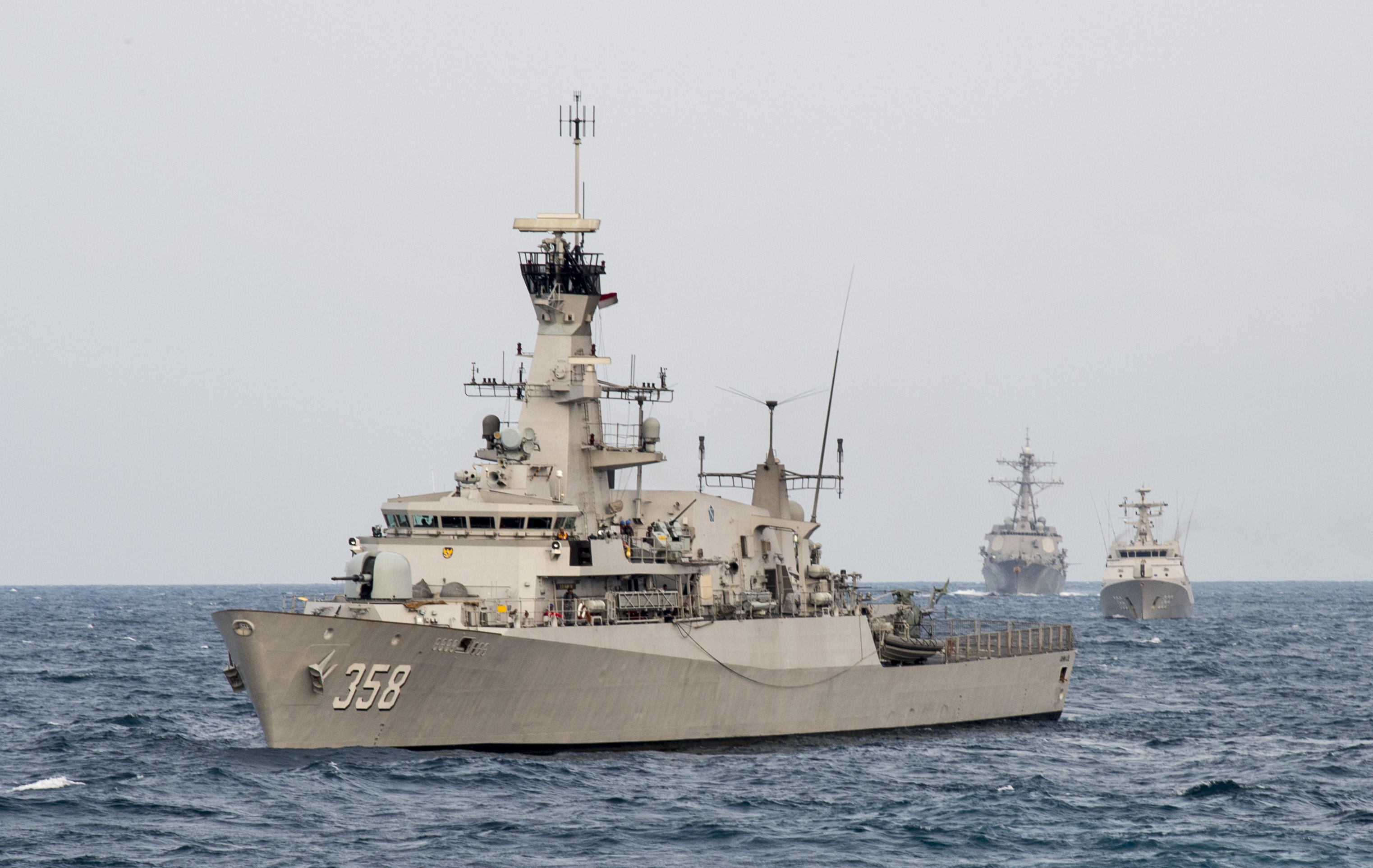
- KRI John Lie lines up for a combined gunnery exercise during CARAT Indonesia 2015

History

Brunei
- Name: Nakhoda Ragam
- Namesake: Nakhoda Ragam
- Builder: BAE Systems Marine, Scotstoun, Scotland
- Launched: 13 January 2001
- Identification: Pennant number: 28
- Fate: Sold to Indonesian Navy in 2014

Indonesia
- Name: John Lie
- Namesake: John Lie Tjeng Tjoan
- Commissioned: 18 July 2014
- Identification: MMSI number: 525014075; Callsign: PLJU; Pennant number: 358
- Status: In active service

General characteristics
- Class & type: Bung Tomo-class corvette
- Displacement: 1,940 tons
- Length: 89.9 m (294 ft 11 in)
- Height: 3.6 m (11 ft 10 in)
- Installed power: 11,400 hp (8,500 kW)
- Propulsion: 4 x MAN B&W / Ruston Diesel engines 2 x shafts
- Speed: 30 knots (56 km/h; 35 mph) maximum
- Range: 5,000 nmi (9,300 km; 5,800 mi)
- Endurance: 21 days
- Boats & landing craft carried: 2 x patrol craft
- Complement: 103
- Sensors & processing systems: Ultra Electronics / Radamec Series 2500 electro-optic weapons director.; Thales Underwater Systems TMS 4130C1 hull-mounted sonar; BAE Systems Insyte AWS-9 3D E- and F-band air and surface radar; BAE Systems Insyte 1802SW I / J-band radar trackers; Kelvin Hughes Type 1007 navigation radar; Thales Nederland Scout radar for surface search; Thales Nederland Sensors Cutlass 242 countermeasure
- Armament: Guns : 1 x OTO Melara 76 mm gun; 2 x DS 30B REMSIG 30 mm guns; 16 Vertical launching system for MBDA (BAE Systems) Seawolf surface-to-air missile launcher (retired and planned to be replaced with VL MICA or Sea Ceptor); 2 x 4 MBDA (Aerospatiale) Exocet MM40 Block II missile launchers; 2 x triple BAE Systems Mark 32 Surface Vessel Torpedo Tubes
- Aircraft carried: 1 × helicopter
- Aviation facilities: Helicopter landing platform

KRI John Lie (358) is a Bung Tomo-class corvette in service with the Indonesian Navy. She was originally built for the Royal Brunei Navy and launched as KDB Nakhoda Ragam. John Lie is named after Indonesian Navy officer and the first Chinese Indonesian admiral, Admiral John Lie Tjeng Tjoan.

== Class background ==
The Bung Tomo-class corvettes are three vessels built by BAE Systems Marine (now BAE Systems Maritime – Naval Ships). The contract was awarded to GEC-Marconi in 1995 and the ships, a variant of the F2000 design, were launched in January 2001, June 2001 and June 2002 at the then BAE Systems Marine yard at Scotstoun, Glasgow. The customer refused to accept the vessels and the contract dispute became the subject of arbitration. When the dispute was settled in favour of BAE Systems, the vessels were handed over to Royal Brunei Technical Services in June 2007.

In 2007, Brunei contracted the German Lürssen shipyard to find a new customer for the three ships. In 2013, Indonesia bought the vessels for £380 million or around half of the original unit cost.

The ships were originally armed with MBDA Exocet Block II anti-ship missiles and MBDA Seawolf air-defence missiles. The main gun is an OTO Melara 76 mm; the ship also carries two torpedo tubes, two 30 mm remote weapon stations and has a landing spot for a helicopter. As of 2018, the MBDA Seawolf missile was out of service there was plans to replace it with the VL Mica.

== Construction and career ==
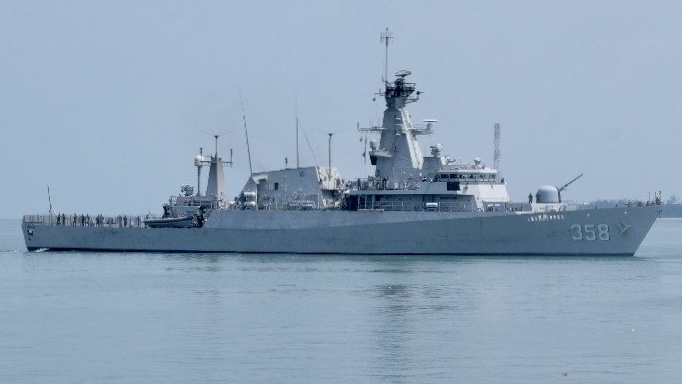
KRI John Lie (358)

KDB Nakhoda Ragam was launched on 13 January 2001 and commissioned into the Indonesian Navy on 18 July 2014. She originally had the hull number 28 but were later changed to 358. She was never commissioned in the Royal Brunei Navy.

The Armed Forces Command of Western Indonesian Komando Armada I (Koarmabar) began increasing its capabilities as both KRI Bung Tomo and KRI John Lie were added to strengthen patrols in the waters of western Indonesia on 13 April 2013.

On 3 August 2015, John Lie participated in the Combat Afloat Readiness and Training 2015. It is an exercise hosted between the United States Navy and the Indonesian Navy.

On 13 April 2018, John Lie and KRI Bung Tomo arrived at Pondok Payung Pier, Tanjung Priok, North Jakarta, at 10:00.

In 2021, it was deployed to search for the wreckage of Sriwijaya Air Flight 182, which crashed into the sea four minutes after takeoff.

On July 24, 2021, Cambodian government sent a diplomatic red notice through its embassy, requesting the support of Indonesian authorities to seize a rogue tanker ship, MT Strovolos, that reportedly stole 300 thousand barrels of oil from Cambodia. At the time, John Lie was deployed on routine patrols on the waters of Anambas Islands Regency, managed to detect and seize the Bahaman-flagged MT Strovolos carrying 19 crew members. The tanker carried 297,686.518 barrels of gross crude oil and sailed from Thailand towards Batam without activating its Automatic Identification System while in the Indonesian waters. John Lie then escorted the tanker to the Batam Naval Base.

Between 14 and 17 October 2025, the ship participated in Exercise Samudra Shakti with the Indian Navy corvette INS Kavaratti (P31). The harbour phase was hosted in Visakhapatnam in India followed by the sea phar which included Helicopter Operations, Air Defence Exercises, Weapon Firing Drills, Visit, Board, Search and Seizure (VBSS) exercises.

In November 2025, KRI John Lie was included in the Indonesian Navy's Bung Tomo-class modernization programme. The project is being carried out by PT Len Industri (Persero), Thales Nederland, and Nevesbu as part of a class-wide effort to standardize combat systems, sensors, and mission equipment across all three vessels of the class. The modernization programme follows the ongoing upgrade of KRI Usman Harun.
