= Defend ID =

Indonesian state-owned defense industry holding company

PT Len Industri (Persero)
- Trade name: DEFEND ID
- Type: State-owned enterprise (Persero)
- Industry: Defense, Electronics, Transportation, Energy
- Predecessor: Lembaga Elektroteknika Nasional, Indonesian Institute of Sciences
- Founded: October 7, 1991
- Headquarters: Bandung, West Java, Indonesia
- Area served: Indonesia
- Key people: Joga Dharma Setiawan (President Director); Tri Budi Utomo (President Commissioner)
- Products: Command and control systems; Communication systems; Sensor systems; Weapon control systems; Electronic combat equipment; Training systems; Railway signaling systems; Railway telecommunications systems; Railway traction systems; Traction substations; Solar panels; Electronic ID card readers
- Revenue: US$1.23 billion
- Owner: Biro Klasifikasi Indonesia (via Danantara)
- Number of employees: 801 (2020)
- Subsidiaries: PT Pindad; PT Dahana; PT Dirgantara Indonesia; PT PAL Indonesia; PT Eltran Indonesia; PT Surya Energi Indotama; PT Len Railway Systems; PT Len Rekaprima Semesta; PT Len Telekomunikasi Indonesia
- Website: www.len.co.id www.defend.id

PT Len Industri (Persero) (operating under the trade name DEFEND ID, short for Defense Industry Indonesia) is an Indonesian state-owned enterprise engaged in the production of electronic and defense equipment. The Indonesian government holds a majority stake in the company through Danantara.

Headquartered in Bandung, West Java, the company has several subsidiaries in the fields of defense, engineering, transportation systems, new and renewable energy, telecommunications infrastructure, and navigation systems. In January 2022, the government officially designated PT Len Industri as the parent company of the state-owned defense industry holding, comprising PT Pindad, PT Dahana, PT Dirgantara Indonesia, and PT PAL Indonesia. The company subsequently launched DEFEND ID as the holding's identity.

== History ==
The company traces its origins to 1965 as the Lembaga Elektroteknika Nasional (LEN, National Electrotechnics Institute) under the Indonesian Institute of Sciences (LIPI), initially focusing on research in the field of broadcasting. In 1983, LEN began pioneering railway signaling systems, and two years later started developing home solar energy systems. In 1991, LEN was officially separated from LIPI to form PT Len Industri (Persero).

In 2001, for the first time, an electromechanical interlocking system manufactured by the company was installed at Tagogapu Station, Bandung Barat. In 2004, the company produced navigation systems for Indonesian Navy ships and anti-aircraft missiles. In 2005, an electronic interlocking system produced by Len Industri was put into operation at Slawi Station, Tegal. In the same year, VHF TV transmitters manufactured by the company were also exported to Malaysia. In 2006, Len Industri installed solar panels for hundreds of lighthouses across Indonesia. In 2007, TV transmitters from the company were exported to East Timor.

In 2015, Len Industri built Indonesia's first solar power plant (PLTS) with a capacity of 5 MWp in Kupang, East Nusa Tenggara. From 2016 onwards, the company has been producing signaling systems for the Soekarno-Hatta Airport Skytrain, South Sumatra LRT, LRT Jakarta, and LRT Jabodebek. The company also began producing LenSOLAR, rooftop solar cells for homes and factories, and started developing defense radars.

On 12 January 2022, the government officially designated PT Len Industri (Persero) as the parent holding company of the state-owned defense industry, comprising PT Pindad, PT Dahana, PT Dirgantara Indonesia, and PT PAL Indonesia. PT Pindad was assigned to focus on land defense platforms, PT Dirgantara Indonesia on airborne platforms, PT PAL Indonesia on naval platforms, while PT Dahana was assigned to produce explosives for defense purposes.

On 20 April 2022, President Joko Widodo officially launched "DEFEND ID" as the identity of the holding company. DEFEND ID set a target to become one of the top 50 defense companies in the world by 2024. In March 2025, the government transferred a majority stake in the company to Biro Klasifikasi Indonesia, as part of efforts to form an operational holding within the Danantara structure.

On 17 February 2023, PT Len Industri launched a new corporate logo to reflect its role as the parent holding of DEFEND ID. The ribbon-cutting ceremony was carried out by President Director Bobby Rasyidin and Commissioner representative Dean Arslan at Grha Len, Bandung.

== Subsidiaries ==
As the parent company of the DEFEND ID defense industry holding, PT Len Industri oversees the following subsidiaries:

- PT Pindad – Producer of land defense platforms.
- PT Dahana – Producer of explosives for defense purposes.
- PT Dirgantara Indonesia – Producer of airborne defense platforms.
- PT PAL Indonesia – Producer of naval defense platforms.
- PT Len Railway Systems – Mechanical and electrical company for railway signaling systems.
- PT Len Rekaprima Semesta – Company handling operations and maintenance of railway systems.
- PT Len Telekomunikasi Indonesia – Implementing business entity (BUP) assigned to construct and manage the Palapa Ring Middle Package broadband fiber optic backbone network, connecting 17 regencies across Central Indonesia.
- PT Eltran Indonesia – Subsidiary handling transportation support projects.
- PT Surya Energi Indotama – Subsidiary handling solar energy projects.

== Business ==
PT Len Industri (Persero) operates in the fields of defense electronics, transportation systems, new and renewable energy, and information and communication technology (ICT) and navigation systems. Key business areas include:

- Railway signaling systems across major rail corridors in Java, Sumatra, and Sulawesi.
- Urban transport construction in major cities, including South Sumatra LRT, LRT Jakarta, LRT Jabodebek, and the Automated People Mover System (APMS)/Skytrain at Soekarno-Hatta Airport, Jakarta.
- Telecommunications infrastructure networks spanning both urban and remote areas, including the Palapa Ring Middle Package connecting 17 regencies in Central Indonesia.
- Defense electronics for the Indonesian National Armed Forces (TNI), including Communication Tactical Data Link (CTDLS), tactical radio, warship combat systems, drone mission systems, intelligence information systems, Surveillance/GCI Radar, and the Combat Management System (CMS) named Mandhala for use on warships and drones.
- Integration of battery systems on the Starstreak short-range portable air defense system (MANPADS) for the Indonesian Army, conducted jointly with Thales Air Defence Limited at Len Technopark, Subang.
- Solar power plants installed across various regions of Indonesia.
- Weather radar, earthquake monitoring stations, and broadcasting equipment (TV and radio transmitters) installed across Indonesia.

== Human resources ==
As of the end of 2020, Len Industri had 536 organic employees, or 801 employees when organic employees at subsidiaries are included (excluding contract employees).

== See also ==
- State-owned enterprises of Indonesia
- Pindad
- PT PAL Indonesia
- PT Dirgantara Indonesia
- Danantara
