= Max Pangemanan =

Indonesian diplomat

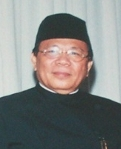

Ambassador of Indonesia to Argentina, Uruguay, and Paraguay
- In office 30 September 2002 – December 2005
- President: Abdurrahman Wahid; Megawati Sukarnoputri; Susilo Bambang Yudhoyono
- Preceded by: Achmad Surjadi
- Succeeded by: Sunten Manurung

Personal details
- Spouse: Dina Sri Hartia
- Education: ??? (Drs.)

Max Pangemanan (died 2 May 2021) is an Indonesian diplomat. A career foreign service officer, Max reached the diplomatic rank of first secretary and was in charge of political affairs at the embassy in the United Kingdom by 1992. He was later reassigned to the embassy in Vienna as the chief of information on 20 June 1994. During the Abdurrahman Wahid administration, Pangemanan was the assistant to the deputy in charge of radio, television, film, and multimedia to the first deputy coordinating minister for people's welfare Syahrul Udjud. President Megawati Sukarnoputri, Abdurrahman Wahid's successor, installed him as ambassador to Argentina, with concurrent accreditation to Paraguay and Uruguay, on 30 September 2002. He presented his credentials to president Eduardo Duhalde of Argentina on 20 November 2002, president Luis González Macchi of Paraguay on 27 November, and to president Jorge Batlle on 28 November. His term in office ended in December 2005. Max died on 2 May 2021.

Max was married to Dina Sri Hartia.
