= Yunnan Tin =

Yunnan Tin Group (Holding) Company Limited 雲南錫業集團(控股)有限公司

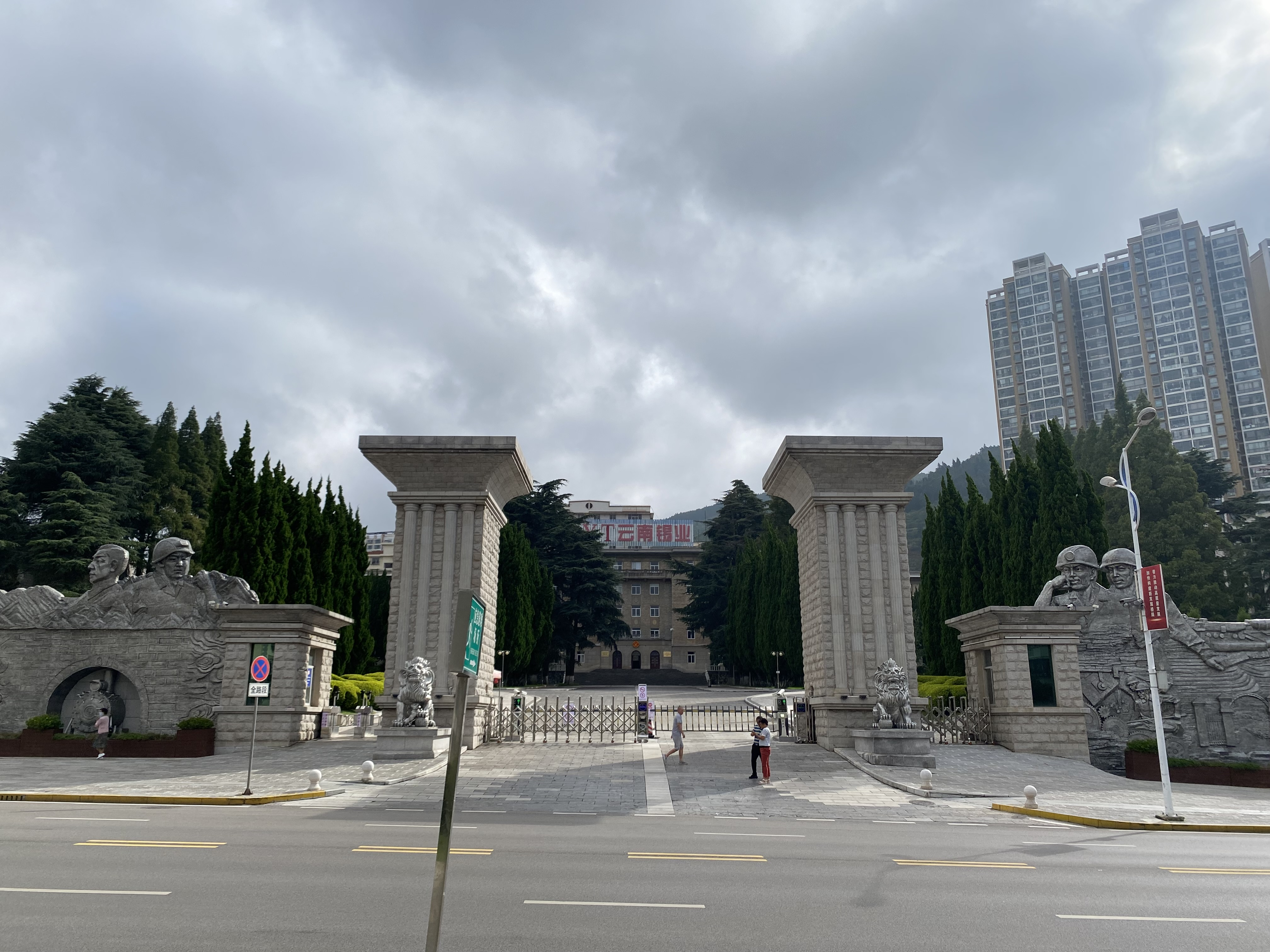
- Headquarters of Yunnan Tin at Gejiu
- Company type: State-owned enterprise
- Industry: Metal mining
- Founded: 1883
- Headquarters: Kunming, Yunnan, People's Republic of China
- Area served: People's Republic of China
- Key people: Chairman: Liu Luke (as of 2024)
- Products: Tin
- Subsidiaries: Yunnan Tin Company Limited; Sino-Platinum Metals Company Limited
- Website: Yunnan Tin Group (Holding) Company Limited

Yunnan Tin Company Limited 雲南錫業股份有限公司
- Company type: State-owned enterprise
- Industry: Metal mining
- Founded: 1998
- Headquarters: Kunming, Yunnan, People's Republic of China
- Area served: People's Republic of China
- Key people: Chairman: Liu Luke (as of 2024)
- Products: Tin
- Parent: Yunnan Tin Group (Holding) Company Limited
- Website: Yunnan Tin Company Limited

Yunnan Tin Group (Holding) Company Limited (YTC) is the largest tin producer and exporter in China and the world. It is headquartered in Kunming, Yunnan. It involves in the production, processing and export of tin metal, and also for the production of tin-based and arsenic-based chemicals. It was established in 1883 by the Government of Qing Dynasty as the Gejiu Manufacture & Commercial Bureau (China Merchants).

It owns two listed subsidiaries, Yunnan Tin Company Limited (SZSE: 000960) and Sino-Platinum Metals Company Limited (SSE: 600459). It was established in 1998 and listed on the Shenzhen Stock Exchange in 2000. It is the only stock company in the Chinese tin industry.

In 2016, China Construction Bank (CCB), a major Chinese lender, entered into a debt-for-equity swap agreement with Yunnan Tin Group. This deal was valued at nearly 5 billion yuan.

== Controversy ==
In 2013, chairman of Yunnan Tin, Lei Yi, had been charged by the Xi Jinping administration of corruption, specifically accepting bribes worth 20 million yuan or 3.3 million USD from Chinese government officials. Among these officials was Li Hongtao, chairman of Leed International Education Group.

== Partnerships ==
As of 2024, Yunnan Tin has partnerships to Indonesian companies PT Timah and its parent company MIND ID.
