= Dahana =

Dahana may refer to:

== Places ==
Iran

- Dahana, Iran, in Sistan and Baluchestan

Tajikistan

- Dahana, Khatlon, a village and a jamoat in Khatlon Region
- Dahana, Asht District, a village in Sughd Region
- Dahana, Yaghnob, a village in Sughd Region

== Other uses ==
- Dahana (moth), a genus of moth
