= John Lie (Indonesian Navy officer) =

Indonesian admiral

John Lie Tjeng Tjoan 李約翰
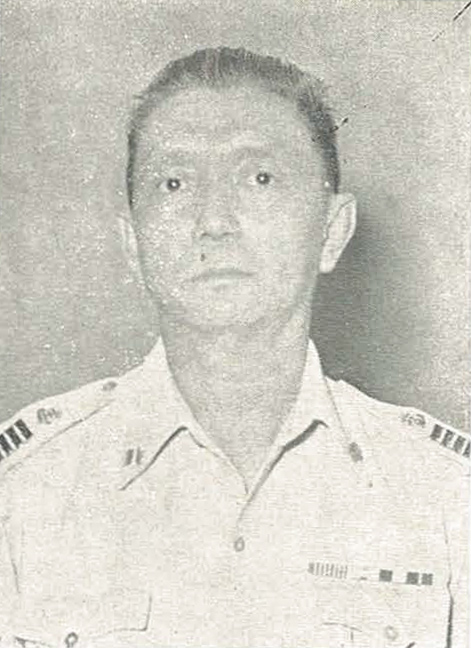
- Lie in 1960
- Born: Lie Tjeng Tjoan 李約翰; 9 March 1911; Manado, Dutch East Indies (now Indonesia)
- Died: 27 August 1988 (aged 77); Jakarta, Indonesia
- Burial place: Kalibata Heroes' Cemetery
- Military career
- Allegiance: Indonesia
- Branch: Indonesian Navy
- Service years: 1945–1966
- Rank: Rear Admiral
- Conflicts: Indonesian National Revolution; PRRI rebellion; Permesta rebellion; South Maluku rebellion
- Awards: National Hero of Indonesia (2009)

Rear Admiral (Ret.) Jahja Daniel Dharma, BMP, also known as John Lie Tjeng Tjoan (Chinese: 李約翰; pinyin: Lǐ Yuēhàn; 9 March 1911 – 27 August 1988), a National Hero of Indonesia, was one of the first high-ranking navy commanders during the Indonesian National Revolution.

== Early life and career ==
He was born in Manado, Sulawesi (then known as Celebes), Dutch East Indies, on 9 March 1911 to Lie Kae Tae and Oei Tjeng Nie Nio. He started his navy career as a ship-navigator on a Dutch merchant vessel, He joined the Kesatuan Rakyat Indonesia Sulawesi (KRIS), a local militia group in Celebes during the Indonesian War of Independence The marine division of this group became later a part of the Indonesian Navy. Initially, he was stationed in the naval harbour of Cilacap, Java. Within a few months, he managed to clear this harbour from mines, placed by the Imperial Japanese Navy against an eventual Allied naval invasion. For his services, he was promoted to mayor laut (lieutenant commander).

== Life as a smuggler ==
In 1947, he was assigned the duty of escorting boats smuggling products to Singapore to be sold for financing the Indonesian independence war. One of his first duties was to escort a convoy of small boats that was carrying 800 tons of rubber to the Chief Representative of the Republic of Indonesia in Singapore, Utoyo Ramelan. During the revolution the Dutch government imposed a naval blockade around Singapore to stop Indonesia from selling goods. Commander John Lie's duties were to penetrate the blockade and smuggle rubber and other products in exchange for arms. The weapons were then handed over to the Indonesian revolutionary troops in Sumatra and among others also to the Regent of Riau, an Indonesian ruler during the Dutch colonial era.

Their efforts were not always easy. The boats used for the smuggling were small coastal transport boats (sampan) and not designed for the high seas. The group had to avoid the better equipped Dutch patrol boats and also the ocean waves. John Lie used a speedboat named the Outlaw for the operations. Once while he was smuggling 18 drums of palm oil, he was captured by British customs. In the Singapore court, however, he was found not guilty and released as he had not violated any British laws. During another incident, while transporting semi-automatic weapons from Johor to Sumatra, he was stopped by a Dutch patrol boat. John Lie informed them that his ship was stranded and couldn't move. Two gunners, probably from the Moluccas, were already aiming their weapons on the Outlaw, but the patrol boat commander didn't issue the shoot command. They just left the Outlaw in the middle of the sea without helping or investigating. After this incident and after handing over the weapons to the Regent Usman Effendi and battalion commander Abusamah, the crew received an official letter from the revolutionary government of Indonesia stating that Outlaw was now part of the Indonesian naval fleet and was designated the official navy-name PPB 58 LB. A week later, John Lie returned to Port Swettenham in Malaya to establish a naval base. This base was used to supply the struggling revolutionary government troops with fuel, gasoline, food, weapons, and other needs to maintain the independence of Indonesia.

== Later life, death, and legacy ==
In early 1950, while in Bangkok, he was called for duty to Surabaya by the Chief of Staff of the Indonesian Navy Admiral Subiyakto and assigned the command of a corvette, R.I. Rajawali. In the following period he commanded his crew in the fight against the Republic of the South Moluccas (RMS) Maluku and Revolutionary Government of the Republic of Indonesia (PRRI) rebellions. He retired from the navy in December 1966 with the rank of rear admiral. In 1967 he changed his name from John Lie to Jahja Daniel Dharma.

He died after a stroke on 27 August 1988 and was buried in the Kalibata Heroes' Cemetery, Jakarta. For his services and contributions to the country, he was posthumously awarded with the Bintang Mahaputera Utama by President Suharto on 10 November 1995.

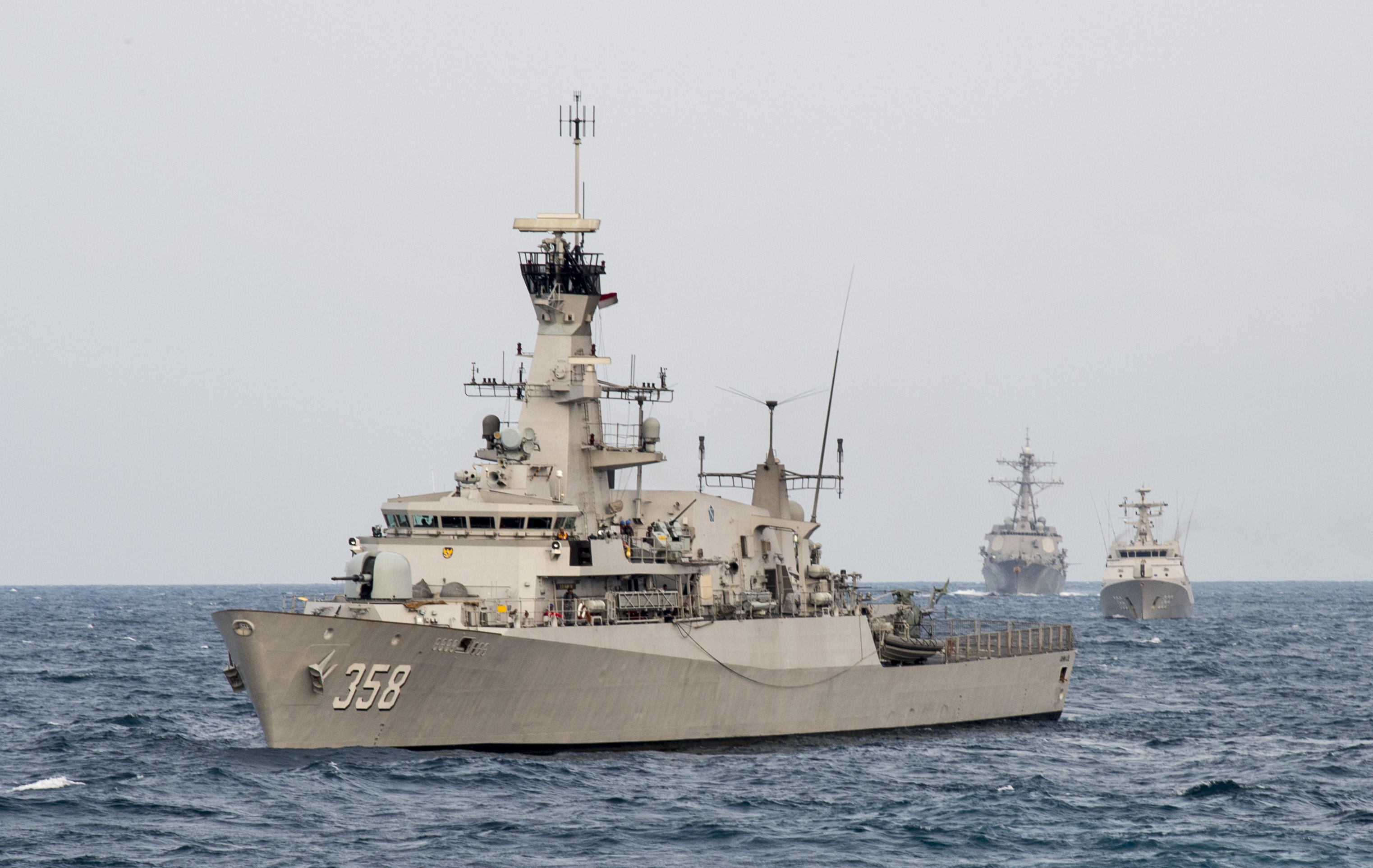
Corvette KRI John Lie (358) of the Indonesian Navy

On 10 November 2009 (Indonesia Heroes' Day), for his services to the country before and after independence, Jahja Daniel Dharma was posthumously awarded the Bintang Mahaputra Adipradana and named an Indonesia National Hero by President Susilo Bambang Yudhoyono on behalf of the nation.

A corvette of the Indonesian Navy (TNI AL) was named after him by the Indonesian Government as part of TNI AL in 2014 along with KRI Bung Tomo and KRI Usman Harun.
