= Sjahrir (economist) =

Indonesian political economist

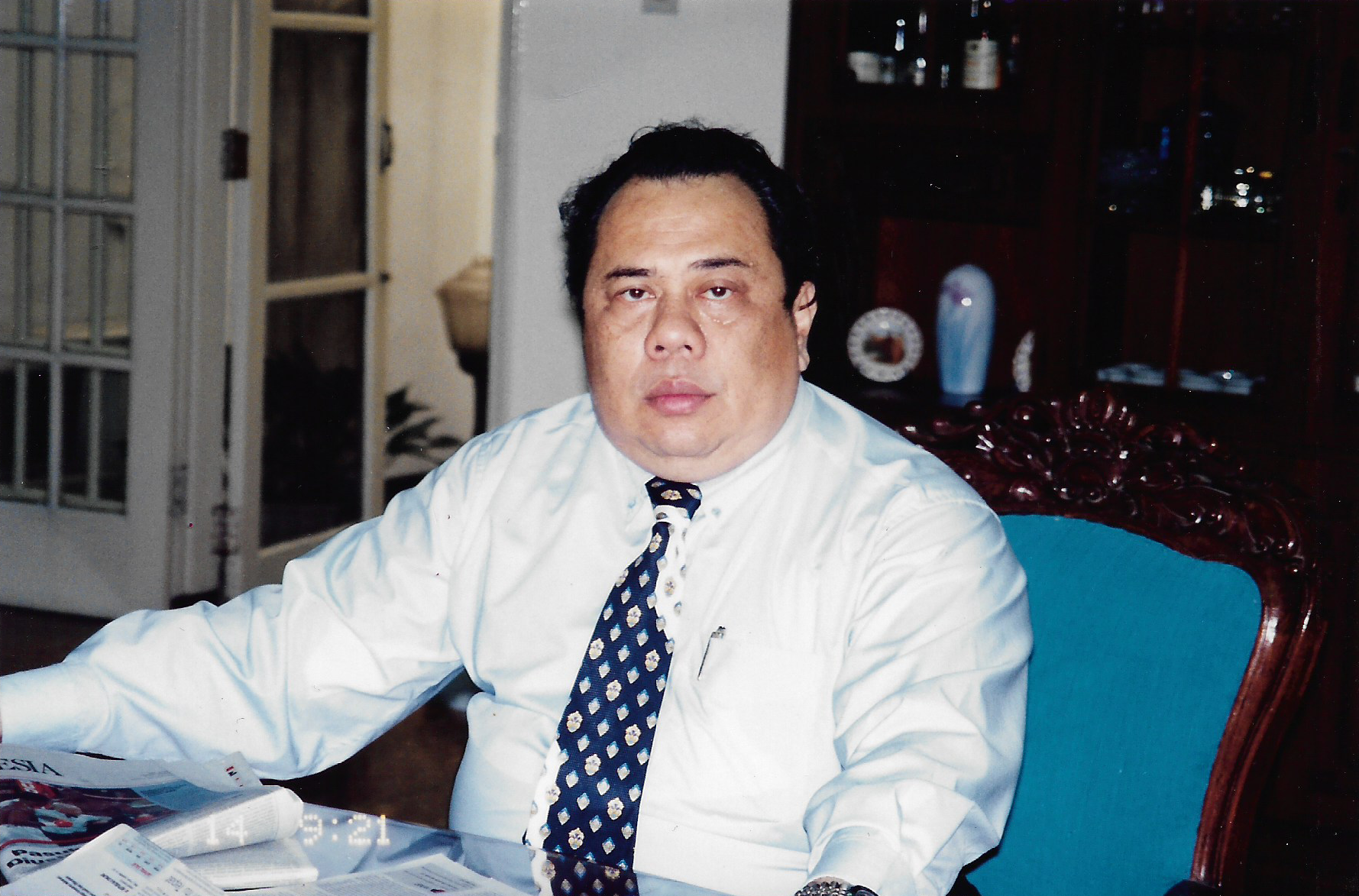

Lecturer of Faculty of Economics and Business of University of Indonesia
- In office 1984–1998

Member of Presidential Advisory Council (Dewan Pertimbangan Presiden)
- In office 2005–2008
- President: Susilo Bambang Yudhoyono

Personal details
- Born: 24 February 1945 Kudus, Japanese East Indies
- Died: 28 July 2008 (aged 63) Singapore
- Education: University of Indonesia; Harvard Kennedy School
- Profession: Economist; Lecturer

Sjahrir (24 February 1945 – 28 July 2008) was a prominent Indonesian political economist. He was officially appointed by President of the Republic of Indonesia, Susilo Bambang Yudhoyono as Economic Adviser in the Council of Presidential Advisers on 11 April 2007. As a student activist, he was once sentenced to jail during the Malari demonstration in 1974.

== Biography ==
Sjahrir was born in Kudus, Central Java, during the Japanese occupation of the Dutch East Indies, on February 24, 1945. Syahrir (nicknamed: Ciil or Ci'il) was born as the only child to Ma’amoen Al Rasyid and Roesma Malik, both from the village of Koto Gedang in West Sumatra. His father was a high-ranking government official in Central Java during the Dutch Colonial Era, while his mother was an official at the Inspectorate of Women Education, Department of Education. (Mangiang et al. 1995)

Sjahrir received his early childhood education in a public school in Jakarta; he also spent a year in the Dalton School Elementary School, Amsterdam. He continued his study at a Catholic high school, Canisius College in Jakarta. It was there that he discovered his desire to learn economics. From Canisius College, he was enrolled at the University of Indonesia, where he studied economics.

During his study in the university, he became active in the Djakarta Students Association (Ikatan Mahasiswa Djakarta or IMADA), a student union. His involvement at IMADA made him appointed as the head of United Actions of Indonesian Students (Kesatuan Aksi Mahasiswa Indonesia or KAMI). Sjahrir was active in KAMI until 1969. Meanwhile, his activities in the Intra University Organization made him appointed as the General Secretary of Students Senate, Faculty of Economics, in the University of Indonesia.

In 1974, students at the University of Indonesia demonstrated against the government’s policy regarding the role of foreign investment in Indonesia. The demonstration led to a riot, known as Malari. Sjahrir, who recently graduated as a Bachelor in Economics from the Faculty of Economy, at the University of Indonesia and who was getting ready to leave the country for a master's degree scholarship at the Harvard Kennedy School at Harvard University, was arrested, tried, and sentenced to 6 and a half years of prison for subversion and his involvement in the Malari riots. However, he only spent almost 4 years in jail as a political detainee.

After getting out of the prison, Ford Foundation, the sponsor of his scholarship, still granted him the opportunity to pursue his master's degree. He graduated from Harvard University with a Ph.D. degree in Political Economy & Government in 1983. He returned to Jakarta in the same year and became a lecturer in his former faculty.

Later, he founded Yayasan Padi & Kapas, an organization that focuses on research, education & public health. During this time, he was active as a consultant and advisor for state banks and public companies.

In 2001, during the Reformation era, Sjahrir founded the New Indonesia Alliance (Perhimpunan Indonesia Baru). The main activity of the Alliance is to organize a cabinet watch. The cabinet watch’s task is to monitor the government’s decisions on certain policies and then to announce the result of the observations to the public.

At the 2004 legislative elections, the New Indonesia Alliance Party (Partai Perhimpunan Indonesia Baru) party won 0.6% of the popular vote and no seats in the National People's Representative Council. He step down as chairman of the party when the 2004 elected president of the Republic of Indonesia, Susilo Bambang Yudhoyono, appointed Sjahrir as Economic Advisor to the President. Sjahrir’s responsibility as Economic Advisor to the President includes being special envoys to other countries, fulfilling presidential missions.

Sjahrir died on 28 July 2008 at Mount Elizabeth Hospital in Singapore from advanced stage of lung cancer. His body was flown back to Indonesia on the following day and was buried in the Tanah Kusir Cemetery, Jakarta, on 29 July 2008.

== Work and publication ==
Sjahrir was known for his extensive writings, including six books that were published between 1994-1995, namely:

1. Ekonomi Indonesia dalam Perspektif Bisnis (The Indonesian Economy in a Business Perspective), published by Jurnalindo Aksara Grafika in Jakarta, 1994.
2. Kebijakan Negara Mengantisipasi Masa Depan (National Policy: Anticipating the Future), published by Yayasan Obor Indonesia in Jakarta, 1994.
3. Pikiran Politik (Political Ideas), published by LP3ES in Jakarta, 1994.
4. Analisis Bursa Efek (Analysis of the Stock Exchange), published by Gramedia Pustaka Utama in Jakarta, 1995.
5. Formasi Mikro-Makro Ekonomi Indonesia (Indonesia's Macro and Micro Economy), published by University of Indonesia Press in Jakarta, 1995.
6. Persoalan Ekonomi Indonesia: Moneter, Perkreditan dan Nenca Pembayaran (Problems of the Indonesian Economy: Money, Credit and the Balance of Payments), published by Pustaka Sinar Harapan in Jakarta, 1995.

== Personal life ==
Sjahrir was married to Nurmala Kartini Sjahrir, a chairman of the Indonesian Anthropological Association, and has a son, Pandu Patria Sjahrir, and a daughter, Gita Sjahrir.
