= Pandu Sjahrir =

Indonesian coal mining entrepreneur

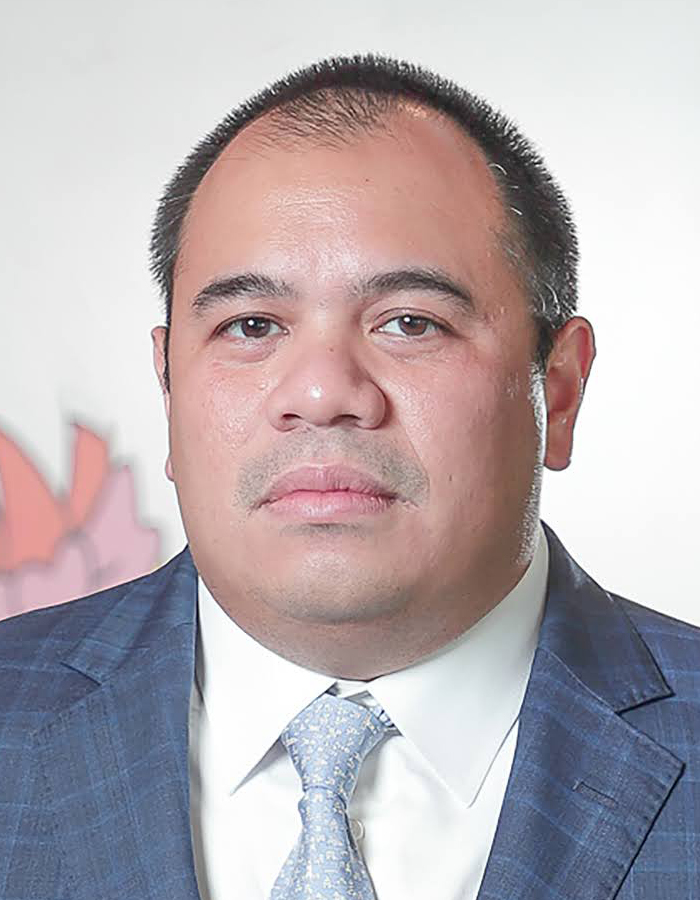
- Born: 17 May 1979; Boston
- Alma mater: University of Chicago; Stanford Graduate School of Business
- Occupation: Director
- Political party: New Indonesia Party
- Awards: Asia's Most Influential Indonesia (2021)

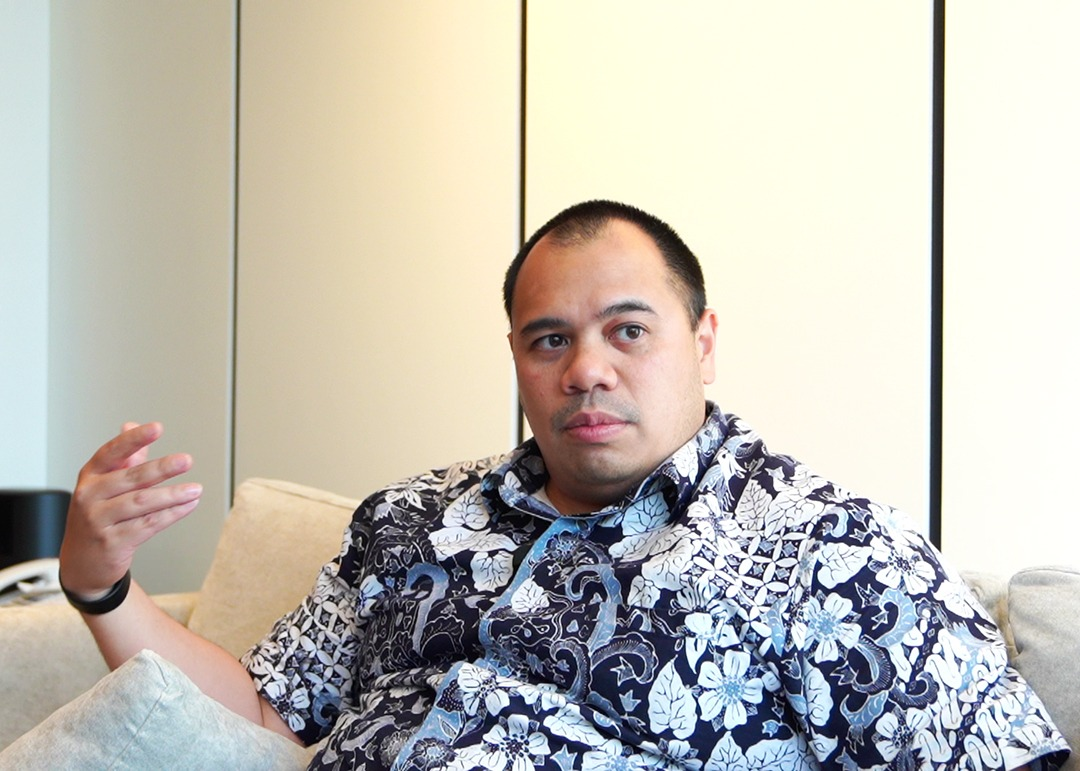
Pandu Patria Sjahrir

Pandu Patria Sjahrir (born in Boston, Massachusetts, 17 May 1979) is one of Indonesia's leading coal mining entrepreneurs. He is Chief Investment Officer of Danantara and a majority shareholder of PT Toba Bara Sejahtera, a company engaged in coal mining industry. Pandu Sjahrir is the Founding Partner of AC Ventures. Pandu also was the head of the APBI-ICMA (Indonesian Coal Mining Association) from 2015-2024.

== Personal life ==
Pandu was born in Brigham and Women's Hospital on 17 May 1979. He is the eldest children of Dr Sjahrir and Nurmala Kartini Sjahrir and also a nephew of Indonesian Coordinating Minister for Maritime Affairs, Luhut Binsar Panjaitan.

Pandu has one sister, namely Gita Rusmida Sjahrir. Both were educated in the United States On 28 June 2008, Pandu married Ratna Marie Kartadjoemena in Washington D.C. His late father, Sjahrir, which was diagnosed with advanced-stage of lung cancer took a time to attend his eldest son's wedding.

=== Education ===
Pandu was enrolled to the Phillips Academy Andover, Massachusetts in 1997. He then pursued an undergraduate program in University of Chicago and was graduated in 2000. He earn his master's degree from Stanford Graduate School of Business in 2007. Now, Pandu is studying at Tsinghua University.

== Career ==
On Monday, 30 June 2020, Pandu was officially appointed by the Indonesian Stock Exchange as Commissioner of the IDX through the Annual General Meeting of Shareholders (AGM) for the 2019 financial year. Pandu serve his term of office from 2020 to 2023. Pandu is the Founding Partner of AC Ventures, a Venture Capital firm focusing on Indonesian startups. He was also the chairman of APBI (Indonesia Coal Mining Association) from 2015-2024.
