= Inalum =

Indonesian state-owned smelting company

PT Indonesia Asahan Aluminium (Persero)
- Trade name: Inalum
- Company type: State-owned enterprise
- Industry: Aluminium smelting
- Founded: 6 January 1976
- Headquarters: Batubara Regency, North Sumatra, Indonesia
- Products: Aluminium ingot, Aluminium alloy, Aluminium billet
- Production output: 245.483 tonnes
- Revenue: Rp 65.28 trillion (2018)
- Operating income: Rp 9.91 trillion (2018)
- Net income: Rp 10.63 trillion (2018)
- Total assets: Rp 165.68 trillion (2018)
- Total equity: Rp 75.99 trillion (2018)
- Owner: PT Mineral Industri Indonesia (Persero)
- Number of employees: 2,057 (2018)
- Website: www.inalum.id www.mind.id

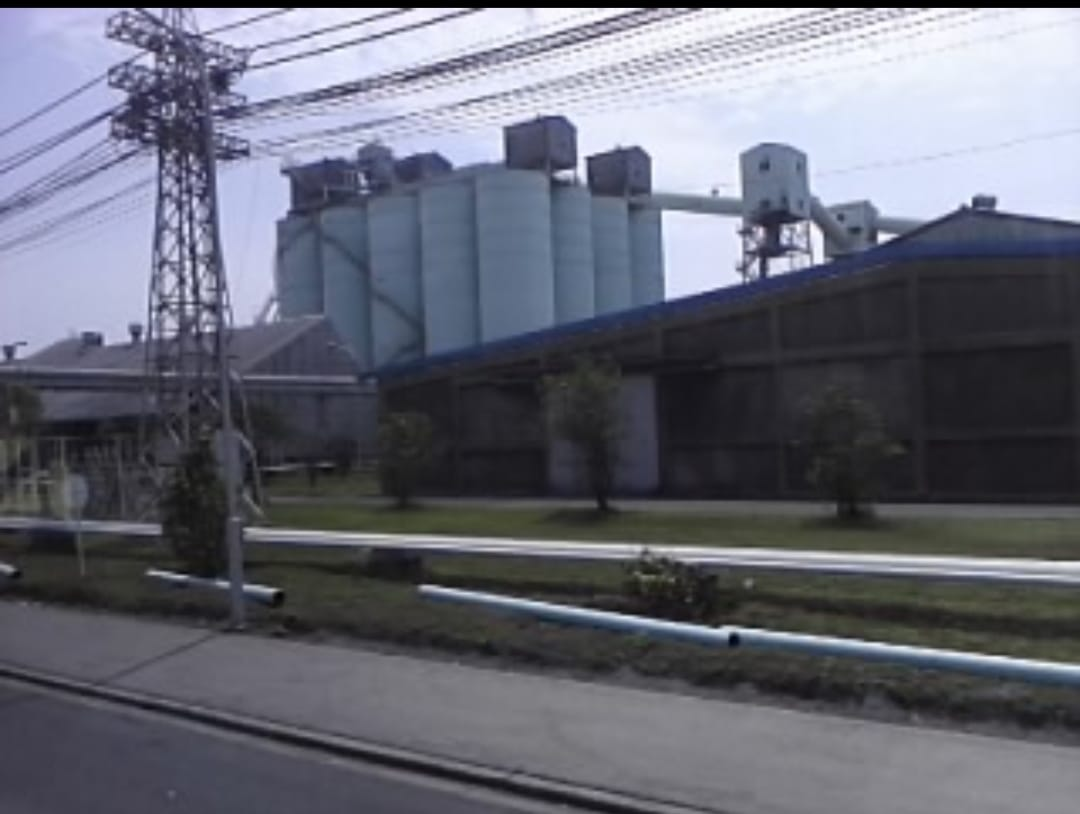
An Inalum facility in Batu Bara Regency, North Sumatra

PT Indonesia Asahan Aluminium, colloquially known as Inalum) is an Indonesian state-owned company specialized in aluminium smelting. The company manages the huge potential of electricity generated from Asahan River. Inalum was first established in 1976 as joint venture company between Indonesian government and Nippon Asahan Aluminium Company, Ltd., before it was fully acquired by the government in 2013.

== History ==
The failure of the Dutch East Indies government to take advantage of the swift flow of water from Lake Toba through Asahan River prompted Indonesian government to build a hydropower plant. In 1972, the hydropower development plan strengthened after the government received a report from Nippon Koei, a Japanese consulting company, that the feasibility study of building hydropower plant was possible to be built as well as an aluminum smelter as the main user of the electricity it produced. Following the study, after lengthy negotiations and with economic assistance from the Japanese government for the project - later known as the Asahan Project, the Indonesian government and 12 Japanese companies signed the master agreement on July 7, 1975, in Tokyo. Furthermore, in order to exercise capital investment in then-established company, the twelve companies together with the Japanese government formed Nippon Asahan Aluminium Co., Ltd. (NAA) on 25 November 1975.

Inalum was established in Jakarta on January 6, 1976, to build and operate the Asahan Project, in accordance with the master agreement. The shares comparison between the Indonesian government and Nippon Asahan Aluminium Co., Ltd. at the time was 10% and 90%, respectively. The shares later changed gradually: in October 1978 the shares became 25% and 75%, in June 1987 it became 41.13% with 58.87%, and since February 10, 1998 it became 41.12% with 58.88%.

To implement the provisions in the master agreement, the Indonesian government issued Presidential Decree No.5/1976 which underlies the formation of the Asahan Project Development Authority as a government representation responsible for the Asahan Project development. Inalum is noted as a pioneer and the first company in Indonesia who engaged in the aluminum smelting industry with total investment of 411 billion Yen.

The status change of Inalum into a state-owned company occurred de facto on 1 November 2013 in accordance with the master agreement. The Indonesian government and Nippon Asahan Aluminium Co., Ltd. terminate the contract on 9 December 2013, and de jure Inalum officially became a state-owned company on 19 December 2013 after the government took over shares owned by the consortium. PT Inalum (Persero) officially became the 141st state-owned company on 21 April 2014 in accordance with Government Regulation No. 26/2014.

Inalum is expected to become a holding holding of all state-owned mining companies. This is done so that the companies have greater integration of operations with diverse mine production while supporting the downstream mine industrialization. Members of the holding company including Aneka Tambang, Bukit Asam, and Timah. In addition, the holding will start a strategic plan to integrate mining production activities and smelting of mining products, including a plan for acquired PT Freeport Indonesia. In August 2019, the holding company renamed as MIND ID, acronym of Mining Industry Indonesia.

In August 2024, Chinese company Yunnan Tin and Indonesian companies PT Timah and its parent company MIND ID entered into a strategic partnership.

== See also ==
- State-owned enterprises of Indonesia
- Aneka Tambang
- Grasberg mine
