= Ministry of State-Owned Enterprises =

Government ministry of Indonesia

- Kementerian Badan Usaha Milik Negara
- Logo of the Ministry of State Owned Enterprises

- Flag of the Ministry of State Owned Enterprises

Ministry overview
- Formed: 16 March 1998; 28 years ago
- Dissolved: 2 October 2025; 10 months ago
- Superseding Ministry: State-Owned Enterprise Regulatory Agency
- Jurisdiction: Government of Indonesia
- Headquarters: Jalan Medan Merdeka Selatan No. 13; Jakarta Pusat 10110; Jakarta, Indonesia
- Website: bumn.go.id

The Ministry of State-Owned Enterprises (Indonesian: Kementerian Badan Usaha Milik Negara, shortened as Kementerian BUMN) was an Indonesian government ministry that oversee the development of state-owned enterprises in Indonesia. The ministry was led by a Minister of State Owned Enterprises, who reports to the President.

On 26 September 2025, the ministry is due to be disbanded and demoted to the cabinet-level agency as the State-Owned Enterprises Regulatory Agency following the revision of the Law on State-Owned Enterprises. The House of Representatives (DPR) ratified the fourth revision of the Law on State-Owned Enterprise on 2 October 2025 and the ministry is officially disbanded.

== History ==
The Ministry of State-Owned Enterprises can be traced back to the Department of Finance. The Ministry of State-Owned Enterprises was in the Second Echelon of the Department of Finance from 1973 to 1993, before being elevated into the First Echelon in 1993. In 1998, the Department of State-Owned Enterprises was created, however, it was regulated under the Department of Finance in its First Echelon from 2000 to 2001. In 2001, the Department of State-Owned Enterprises was renamed the Ministry of State-Owned Enterprises.

The development of state-owned enterprises was on Direktorat Persero dan Pengelolaan Keuangan Perusahaan Negara, which was the Second Echelon Unit in Department of Finance. This unit was also called Direktorat Persero dan Badan Usaha Negara and Direktorat Pembinaan BUMN. This unit was promoted into First Echelon Unit as Direktorat Jenderal Pembinaan Badan Usaha Negara in 1993. In 1998, this unit was promoted into a department and headed by a minister-rank official Menteri Negara Penanaman Modal dan Pembinaan BUMN/Kepala Badan Pembinaan BUMN.

Following formation of Danantara and most of the ministry functions in executing state-owned enterprises, investment management, and restructuration of state-owned enterprises transferred to the agency, the ministry reduced into regulator and representative of Indonesian government as primary shareholder. the ministry is later disbanded and converted into State-Owned Enterprise Regulatory Agency.

== Organisation ==
Ministry of State-Owned Enterprises was organized as 2 vice ministers, one secretariat, 3 deputies and 3 expert staffs.

- 1st Deputy Minister of SOEs
- 2nd Deputy Minister of SOEs
- Ministry Secretariat
- Deputy of Laws and Regulations
- Deputy of Human Resource, Technology, and Information
- Deputy of Finance and Risk Management
- Expert Staff of Strategic Policy Implementation
- Expert Staff of Industry
- Expert Staff of Finance and Micro Small and Medium Enterprise Development

== Gallery ==
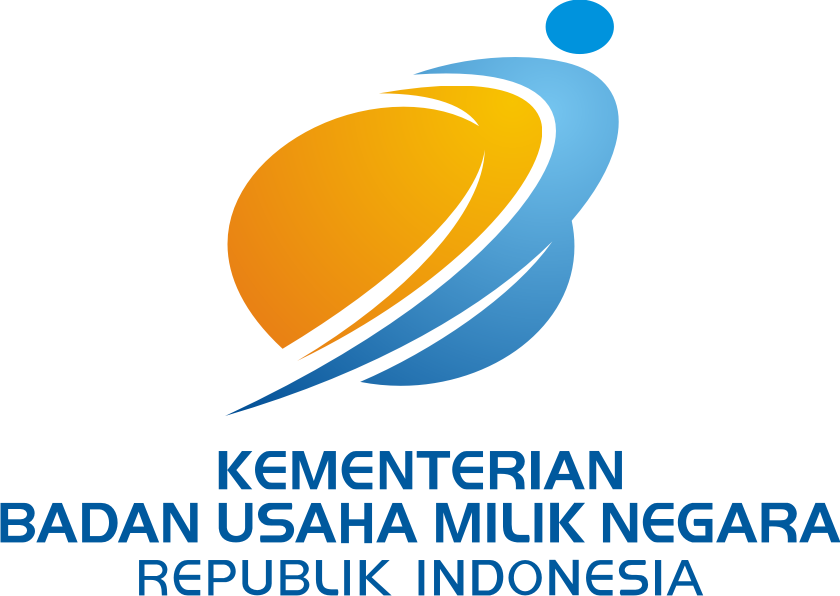
BUMN Logo (2015–2020)

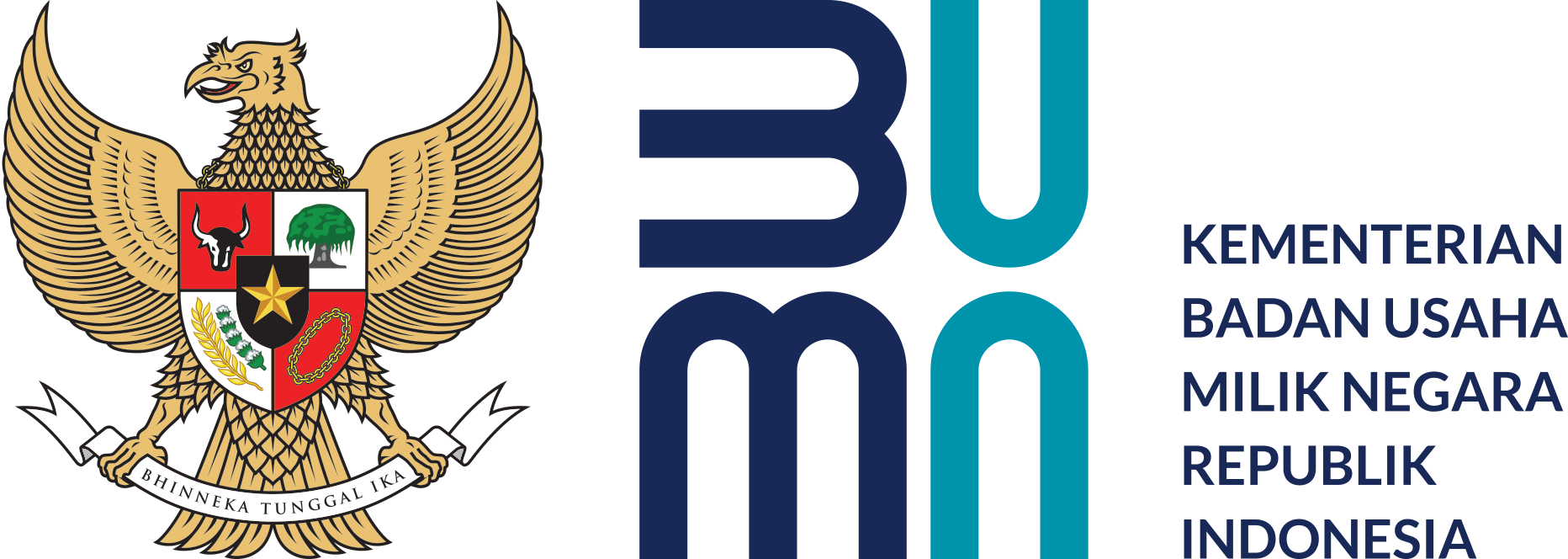
BUMN Logo (2020–2025)

== See also ==
- List of State-owned Enterprises in Indonesia
