= State-owned enterprises of Indonesia =

Corporations owned by Government of Indonesia

The BUMN Untuk Indonesia ("SOEs for Indonesia") campaign was launched by the Ministry of State Owned Enterprises in April 2020; this logo was introduced together with a rebranding of the Ministry and the introduction of the AKHLAK core values across all state-owned enterprises effective on 1 July 2020. It replaces the BUMN Hadir Untuk Negeri ("SOEs Serving the Nation") campaign, launched in 2016 in conjunction with the Ministry's 18th anniversary.

The logo of Danantara as the sovereign wealth fund of Indonesia.

Either logos above appears in nearly all publicity made by Indonesian SOEs (usually placed in the upper-left corner), except Garuda Indonesia and others SOEs under the Ministry of Finance

In Indonesia, state-owned enterprises (Indonesian: Badan Usaha Milik Negara, BUMN) play an important role in the national economy. Their roles includes contributor for national economy growth, providing goods or services which are not covered by private company, employment provider, providing support guidance to small and medium businesses, and source of government revenue. The Daya Anagata Nusantara Investment Management Agency, better known as Danantara (through its subsidiary PT Danantara Asset Management (Persero)), and the State-Owned Enterprises Regulatory Agency (previously the Ministry of State Owned Enterprises) represents the government's function as a shareholder of most of those companies, while some are represented only by the latter or the Ministry of Finance.

Aside from SOEs, there are also provincially- or municipally-owned corporations, locally known as Badan Usaha Milik Daerah (BUMD). The primary difference between BUMNs and BUMDs is the ownership of the enterprise, whereas BUMNs are controlled by the Ministry of State Owned Enterprise while BUMDs are directly controlled by the local government. BUMDs roles are similar with BUMNs, with heavy emphasis on providing goods or services to the local community. In addition, there are also village-owned enterprises which are run by village governments.

== History ==
=== Dutch colonial era ===
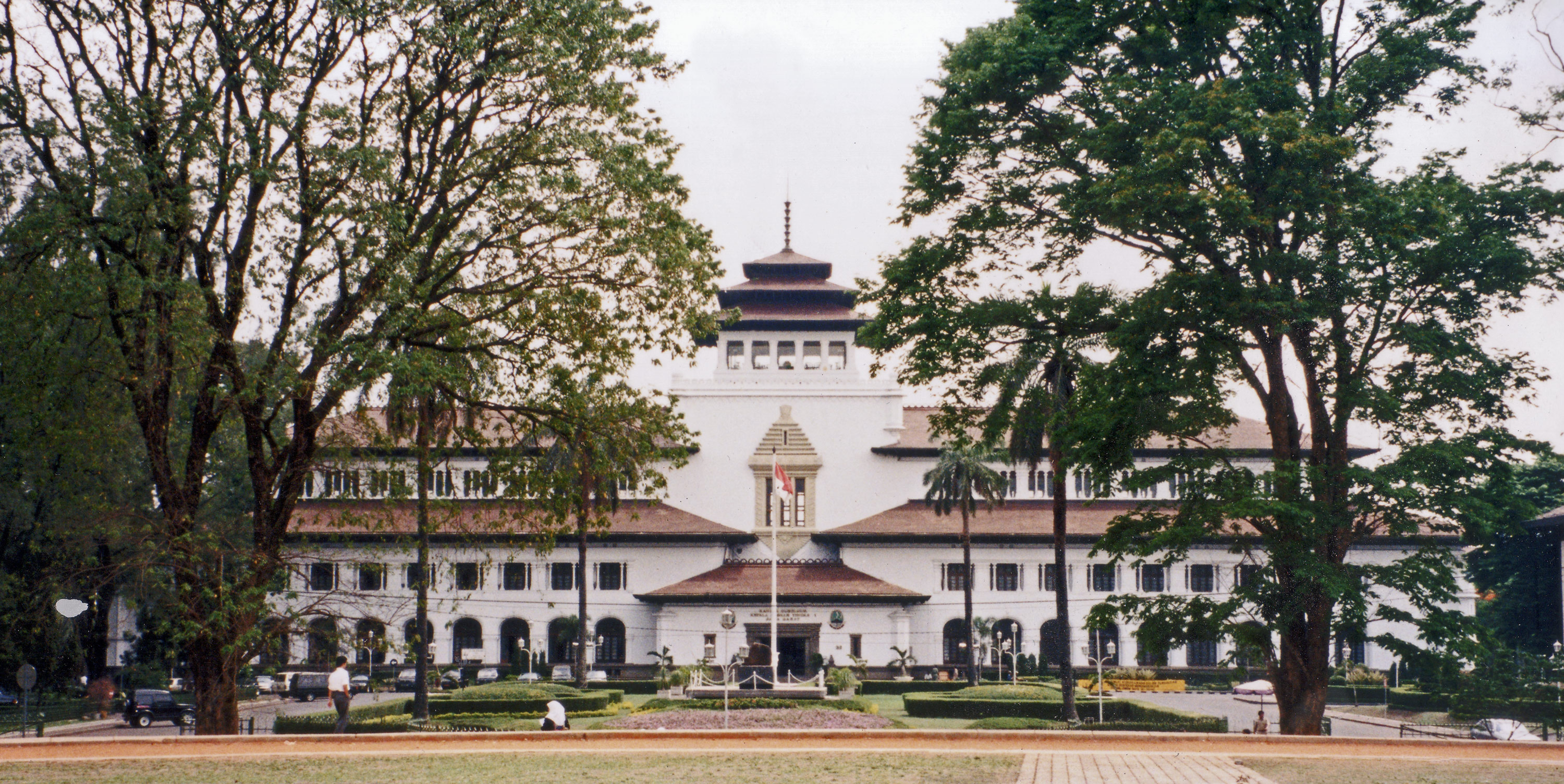
Dutch East Indies Department for State-Owned Enterprises building

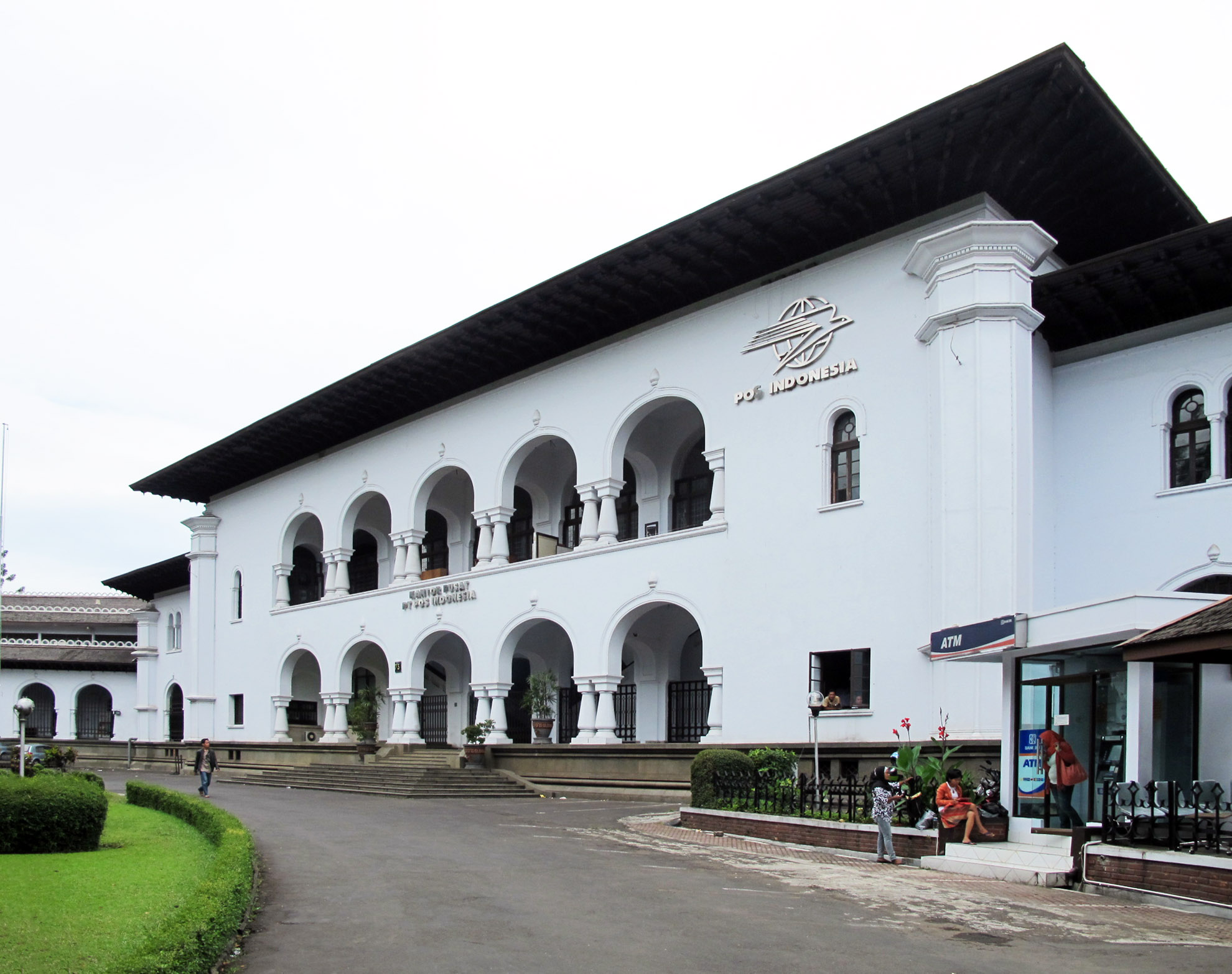
Headquarters of the Posts, Telegraph and Telephone Service of the Dutch East Indies, built simultaneously with the above building, now former headquarters of Pos Indonesia

During the Dutch colonial era, the government had a monopoly on the opium, pawnbroking (nationalized on 1 April 1901), posts (including the Post Office Savings Bank), telegraph and telephone industry, as well as owning most of the railways and electric utilities. They are managed by the Department of State-Owned Enterprises (Dutch: Department van Gouvernementsbedrijven).

=== Post-independence ===
By the end of the Dutch–Indonesian Round Table Conference, the Indonesian government had a major or complete ownership on the public utility, buses, railways, banks and communications.

With the beginning of Guided Democracy in Indonesia, many Dutch-owned companies, or Indonesian branches of Dutch companies, were nationalized (see Nationalized Dutch companies below).

During the New Order, the nationalized companies were still state-owned. Some of the companies were listed in the Jakarta Stock Exchange later on.

Today the largest banks in Indonesia are mostly state-owned.

==== List of foreign companies nationalized during Guided Democracy ====
- Bank Mandiri was a merger of:
  - Bank Ekspor Impor Indonesia (BankExim), formerly the Indonesian branch of Nederlandsche Handels Maatschappij which eventually becomes ABN AMRO
  - Bank Bumi Daya (formerly Bank Umum Negara), the result of the nationalizations of Nationale Handelsbank and the Chartered Bank of India, Australia and China (now Standard Chartered; the latter returning to Indonesia after the New Order went into power)
  - Bank Dagang Negara, formerly Escomptobank, also predecessor to ABN AMRO
  - Bank Pembangunan Indonesia (Bapindo), state-owned since establishment
- Bank Rakyat Indonesia was known as
  - 1895: "Purwokertoan Assistance and Savings Bank for Native Aristocrats" (Dutch: De Purwokertosche Hulp- en Spaarbank der Inlandsche Hoofden).
  - 1934-42: "General Public Credit Bank" (Dutch: Algemene Volkskredietbank),
  - 1942-45: Shomin Ginkō (庶民銀行; "Common People's Bank") during Japanese occupation
- Bank Tabungan Negara was known as
  - 1897-42: "Post Office Savings Bank" (Dutch: Postspaarbank)
  - 1942-45: Savings Office (Japanese: 貯金局, Hepburn: Chokin-kyoku; Nihon-shiki:Tyokin-kyoku)
  - 1945-63: "Post Office Savings Bank" (Indonesian: Bank Tabungan Pos)
- Insurance industry:
  - NV Zee-en Brandassurantie Maatschappij van 1851, NV Zee-en Brandassurantie Maatschappij van 1861, NV Tweede Zee-en Brandassurantie Maatschappij van 1861, NV Zee-en Brandassuratie Maatschappij van 1865, NV Tweede Zee-en Brandassurantie Maatschappij van 1865, and NV Javasche Verszekerings Agenturen Maatschappij were consolidated into PN Asuransi Kerugian Eka Chandra (eventually merged into Jasindo, part of Indonesia Financial Group).
  - NV Assurantie Maatschappij Jakarta, NV Assurantie Kantoor Langeveldt-Schroder, NV Assurantie Kantoor O.W.J. Schlencker, NV Kantoor Asuransi Kali Besar, PT Maskapai Asuransi Arah Baru, Firma Blom & van der Aa, Firma Bekouw & Mynssen, and Firma Sluyters & Co were consolidated into PN Asuransi Kerugian Eka Karya and eventually merged into PT Jasa Raharja, part of Indonesia Financial Group).
  - NV Nederlandsche Lloyd and NV Maskapai Asuransi dan Administrasi Umum Nusantara Lloyd were consolidated into PN Asuransi Kerugian Eka Nusa and eventually merged into PT Asuransi Jasa Indonesia (Jasindo), part of Indonesia Financial Group.
  - NV Levensverzekering Maatschappy "Nilmij van 1859" (also known as the Indonesian branch of Nillmij, the parent of which later becomes Aegon N.V.), NV Levensverzekering Maatschappij van "De Nederlanden van 1845, Onderling Levensverzekering Genootschap "De Olveh van 1879", NV Eerste Nederlandsche Verzekering Maatschappij op het Leven en tegen Invaliditeit, NV Amstleven (Amsterdamse Maatschappij van Levensverzekering), NV Nationale Levensverzekering Bank, Hollandsche Societeit van Levensverzekeringen, NV Levenverzekering Maatschappij "Ons Belang" (Levob), and NV Levensverzekering Maatschappij H.A.V. Bank were consolidated into PN Asuransi Jiwa Eka Sejahtera and eventually becomes PT Asuransi Jiwasraya (Persero).
- Construction industry:
  - NV Architecten-Ingenieursbureau Fermont te Weltevreden en Ed. Cuypers te Amsterdam becomes PN Virama Karya. The company later turned into PT Virama Karya (Persero).
  - Indonesian Electrical and Mechanical Engineers and Contractors (INDEMEC) C.V. formerly Technisch Bureau H&S becomes PN Indra Karya. The company later turned into PT Indra Karya (Persero).
  - PT Biro Arsitek Job & Sprey/Architectenbureau Job en Sprey NV becomes PN Yodya Karya. The company later turned into PT Yodya Karya (Persero).
  - Nederlandse Aannemingsmaatschappij NV (now Ballast Nedam) becomes PN Nindya Karya. The company later turned into PT Nindya Karya (Persero) and is currently a subsidiary of PT Danareksa (Persero).
  - Aannemingsmaatschapij "De Kondor" NV (later IBB-Kondor and KondorWessels and now VolkerWessels) becomes PN Kumala Karya. The company was dissolved in 1971.
  - Hollandsche Beton Maatschappij (eventually merged into Hollandsche Beton Groep and later acquired by Royal BAM Group) becomes PN Hutama Karya. The company later turned into PT Hutama Karya (Persero). Hollandsche Beton Groep itself would return in 1970 as Decorient Indonesia; in the early 2020s the company (then called BAM Decorient Indonesia) would be bought out by its management and renamed Decorient Partaya Indonesia.
  - Royal Adriaan Volker Group (now VolkerWessels) trading as Volker Aannemingsmaatschappij NV in Indonesia, becomes PN Waskita Karya. The company later turned into PT Waskita Karya (Persero).
  - NV Pembangunan Perumahan becomes PN Pembangunan Perumahan and eventually turned into PT Pembangunan Perumahan (Persero).
  - NV Technisch Handelmaatschappij Vis & Co. becomes PN Wijaya Karya. The company later turned into PT Wijaya Karya (Persero).
  - Architecten, Ingineurs en Aannemersbedrijf Associatie Selle en de Bruyn, Reyerse en de Vries NV becomes PN Adhi Karya. The company later turned into PT Adhi Karya (Persero).
  - NV "Ingenieurs Bureau Ingenegeren-Vrijburg" becomes PN Indah Karya. The company later turned into PT Indah Karya (Persero).
  - NV Air Bersih
- Perusahaan Perdagangan Indonesia (Indonesia Trading Company) is a nationalized company from several trading companies such as N.V. Borneo Sumatra Maatschappij (Borsumij), Internationale Crediet- en Handelsvereeniging "Rotterdam" (Internatio, one of the predecessors of Imtech), Lindeteves, and Geo Wehry.
- PT Sang Hyang Seri from Pamanukan & Tjiasem Lands (since 1940, nationalized at 1957).
- PT Rajawali Nusantara Indonesia from Kian Gwan (nationalized at 1961).
- Perum DAMRI (Djawatan Angkoetan Motor Repoeblik Indonesia) from the Java Transportation Enterprise (Japanese: ジャワ運輸事業社, Hepburn: Jawa Un'yu Jigyōsha; Nihon-shiki: Zyawa Un'yu Zigyôsya) and Automobile Board (Japanese: 自動車総局, Hepburn: Jidōsha Sōkyoku; Nihon-shiki: Zidôsha Sôkyoku).
- PT Garuda Indonesia
  - 1928-42: Royal Dutch Indies Airways (Koninklijke Nederlandsch-Indische Luchtvaart Maatschappij)
  - 1947-49: KLM Interinsulair Bedrijf
- Indonesian Railway Company (Kereta Api Indonesia)
  - 1863-1942: Nederlandsch-Indische Spoorweg Maatschappij
  - 1875-42: Staatsspoor-en-Tramwegen in Nederlandsch–Indië
  - 1945-58: Staatsspoorwegen Verenigde Spoorwegbedjrif (SS/VS) (fully nationalized at 1958)
- Pengangkutan Penumpang Djakarta
  - 1925–42,45-54 : Bataviache Verkeers Maatchappij (BVMNV)
  - 1942-45: Jakarta Tram (ジャカルタ市電, Jakarta Shiden)

=== AKHLAK ===
On 1 July 2020, the Ministry of State Owned Enterprises uniformized the corporate core values of all state-owned enterprises into what is called AKHLAK. The implementation of AKHLAK in all state-owned enterprises was intended "to create strong SOEs that have global competitiveness with human resources that are qualified, talented, cultured and highly performed." They are:

- Trustworthy (Amanah) - Being accountable and have integrity in fulfilling mandates
- Competent (Kompeten) - Learning and growing capabilities continuously
- Harmonious (Harmonis) - Care for others and respect differences
- Loyal - Dedicated and putting the interest of the Nation and State above others
- Adaptive (Adaptif) - Continuously innovating and staying spirited in driving and addressing changes
- Collaborative (Kolaboratif) - Building synergy and cooperation

== Types of SOEs ==
Since 2003, there are two types of state-owned enterprises (SOEs) in Indonesia:

- Perusahaan Umum (Perum) (lit. 'public company'), are statutory public-benefit corporations with no shareholders. The main purpose of these SOEs is to provide goods and/or services to public. These firms are allowed to pursue profits. Perums, however, are increasingly rare as the government are converting many of them into perusahaan perseroan (see below), especially after the 1980s.
- Perusahaan Perseroan (Persero) are SOEs which are perseroan terbatas (PT) (i.e. a joint-stock company). This type of SOE is more independent than the Perums and the main goals of these firms are to gain profits and contribute to government revenue. This type of SOE is easy to recognize because they have the term Persero attached to their names. These SOEs, however, are subject to general perseroan terbatas laws, and similar to ordinary PTs its establishment and amendments to its articles of association, including increases to its capital, must be executed before a civil law notary with a notarial act, unlike Perums where its Articles of association (including amendments and capital increases) is directly legislated. Since 2025, almost all of these SOEs are controlled by Danantara through PT Danantara Asset Management (Persero), although the central government still has direct control by exercising Dwiwarna, or golden share.
  There are two sub-type of Perusahaan Perseroan:
1. Perusahaan Perseroan Terbuka (Persero Tbk.), or Public company, which are enterprises whose ownership belongs both to the government and to the general public which issue freely traded shares the stock exchange (or in over the counter markets). This subtype of SOEs also has the suffix Tbk. attached to their names.
2. Perusahaan Perseroan Pemerintah which are enterprises whose ownership are 100% government-owned.

Until 2003, there was also another type of SOE called Perusahaan Jawatan (Perjan/PJ) (lit. 'service company') which had operational costs funded from the national budget. Employees of these SOEs were civil servants and the companies were regarded as government agencies. Firms in this category have been either upgraded into other types of SOEs or converted into government agencies.

== List of companies ==
Information on the state-owned enterprises (SOEs) is drawn from the Ministry of State Owned Enterprises and the Ministry of the State Secretariat's Legal Documentation and Information Network portals.

Indonesian SOEs subdivided into 12 clusters.

Telecommunication and Media Services
Company	Common name	Sector	Website
PT Telkom Indonesia (Persero) Tbk	Telkom	Telecommunications	https://www.telkom.co.id/
PT Danareksa (Persero)	Danareksa	Holding Company	https://www.danareksa.co.id/
Perum Lembaga Kantor Berita Nasional Antara	ANTARA	News Agency	http://www.antaranews.com/

Energy, Oil, and Gas Industry
Company	Common name	Sector	Website
PT Perusahaan Listrik Negara (Persero)	PLN	Electricity Supply	https://www.pln.co.id/
PT Pertamina (Persero)	Pertamina	Mining and Exploration	https://www.pertamina.com/

Tourism and Support Services
Company	Common name	Sector	Website
PT Aviasi Pariwisata Indonesia (Persero)	InJourney	Holding Company	https://injourney.id/
PT Garuda Indonesia (Persero) Tbk	Garuda Indonesia	Air Transportation	https://www.garuda-indonesia.com/
Perum Lembaga Penyelenggara Pelayanan Navigasi Penerbangan Indonesia	AirNav Indonesia	Air Traffic Management	https://www.airnavindonesia.co.id/

Insurance and Pension Fund Services
Company	Common name	Sector	Website
PT Bahana Pembinaan Usaha Indonesia (Persero)	Indonesia Financial Group (IFG)	Holding Company	https://www.ifg.id/
PT Asuransi Sosial Angkatan Bersenjata Republik Indonesia (Persero)	ASABRI	Police and Army Insurance	https://www.asabri.co.id/
PT Reasuransi Indonesia Utama (Persero)	Indonesia Re	Insurance	https://www.indonesiare.co.id/
PT Dana Tabungan dan Asuransi Pegawai Negeri (Persero)	TASPEN	Pension Fund Management	https://www.taspen.co.id/

Financial Services
Company	Common name	Sector	Website
PT Bank Rakyat Indonesia (Persero) Tbk	BRI	Financial Services and Banking	https://www.bri.co.id/
PT Bank Mandiri (Persero) Tbk	Bank Mandiri	Financial Services and Banking	https://bankmandiri.co.id/
PT Bank Negara Indonesia (Persero) Tbk	BNI	Financial Services and Banking	https://www.bni.co.id/
PT Bank Tabungan Negara (Persero) Tbk	BTN	Financial Services and Banking	https://www.btn.co.id/
PT Bank Syariah Indonesia (Persero) Tbk	BSI	Financial Services and Banking	https://www.bankbsi.co.id/
Perum Percetakan Uang Republik Indonesia	Peruri	Printing	https://www.peruri.co.id/

Food and Fertilizer Industry
Company	Common name	Sector	Website
Perum BULOG	BULOG	Food Supply Chain	https://www.bulog.co.id/
PT Pupuk Indonesia (Persero)	Pupuk Indonesia	Processing Manufacture	https://www.pupuk-indonesia.com/
PT Rajawali Nusantara Indonesia (Persero)	ID FOOD	Plantation, Holding Company	https://idfood.co.id/

Infrastructure Services
Company	Common name	Sector	Website
PT Jasa Marga (Persero) Tbk	Jasa Marga	Toll Road Management	https://www.jasamarga.com/
PT Adhi Karya (Persero) Tbk	Adhi	Construction	https://www.adhi.co.id/
PT Hutama Karya (Persero)	HK	Construction and Toll Road Management	https://www.hutamakarya.com/
PT Waskita Karya (Persero) Tbk	Waskita	Construction	https://www.waskita.co.id/
PT Pembangunan Perumahan (Persero) Tbk	PP	Construction	https://www.ptpp.co.id/
PT Wijaya Karya (Persero) Tbk	Wika	Construction	https://www.wika.co.id/
PT Brantas Abipraya (Persero)	Abipraya	Construction	https://www.brantas-abipraya.co.id/
PT Semen Indonesia (Persero) Tbk	Semen Indonesia Group (SIG)	Processing Manufacture	https://www.sig.id/
Perum Pembangunan Perumahan Nasional	Perumnas	Construction and Housing	https://www.perumnas.co.id/

Plantation and Forestry Industry
Company	Common name	Sector	Website
Perum Kehutanan Negara	Perhutani	Forestry	https://www.perhutani.co.id/
PT Perkebunan Nusantara III (Persero)	Perkebunan Nusantara	Plantation, Holding Company	https://www.perkebunannusantara.com/

Mineral and Coal Industry
Company	Common name	Sector	Website
PT Mineral Industri Indonesia (Persero)	Mineral Industry Indonesia (MIND ID)	Mining and Exploration	https://mind.id/

Manufacturing and Survey Industry
Company	Common name	Sector	Website
PT Biro Klasifikasi Indonesia (Persero)	ID SURVEY	Ship Classification and Statutory, Holding Company	http://www.idsurvey.id/
PT Len Industri (Persero)	Defense Industry Indonesia (DEFEND ID)	Processing Manufacture, Holding Company	https://defend.id/
PT Krakatau Steel (Persero) Tbk	Krakatau Steel	Processing Manufacture	https://www.krakatausteel.com/

Logistic Services
Company	Common name	Sector	Website
Perum DAMRI	DAMRI	Transportation	https://www.damri.co.id/
PT Kereta Api Indonesia (Persero)	KAI	Railway Service	https://www.kai.id/
PT Industri Kereta Api (Persero)	INKA	Railway Manufacture	https://www.inka.co.id/
PT Pos Indonesia (Persero)	POS IND	Post and Mail Service	https://www.posindonesia.co.id/
PT Pelayaran Nasional Indonesia (Persero)	Pelni	Sea Transportation	https://www.pelni.co.id/
PT ASDP Indonesia Ferry (Persero)	ASDP	River and Water Transport Provider	https://www.asdp.id/
PT Pelabuhan Indonesia (Persero)	Pelindo	Sea Port Management	https://www.pelindo.co.id/

Health Industry
Company	Common name	Sector	Website
PT Bio Farma (Persero)	Biofarma	Vaccines, Holding Company	https://www.biofarma.co.id/

== See also ==
- State owned enterprise
