= New Indonesia National Sovereignty Party =

New Indonesia National Sovereignty Party Partai Kedaulatan Bangsa Indonesia Baru
- Abbreviation: PKBIB
- Leader: Yenny Wahid
- Secretary-General: Imron Rosyadi Hamid
- Founded: 23 September 2002 (as New Indonesia Alliance Party); 10 November 2007 (as New Indonesia Party of Struggle); 12 Juli 2012 (as New Indonesia National Sovereignty Party)
- Merger of: Nusantara National Prosperity Party
- Headquarters: Jl. Kalibata Timur I No 12, South Jakarta, Jakarta
- Ideology: Pancasila; Social democracy Islamic democracy Pan-Islamism
- Political position: Big tent

Website
- partai-pib.or.id

The New Indonesia National Sovereignty Party (Indonesian: Partai Kedaulatan Bangsa Indonesia Baru) is a political party in Indonesia. It was established as the New Indonesia Alliance Party (Partai Perhimpunan Indonesia Baru) by the economist Dr. Sjahrir and was initially made up of university students, middle-class people and the leaders of several political parties. In a speech on 23 September 2002, Sjahrir said he wanted to establish the party because he was frustrated and angry with the political situation dominated by corruption and the craving for power.

At the last legislative elections, 5 April 2004, the party won 0.6% of the popular vote and no seats in the People's Representative Council. It is to contest the 2009 elections under the new name New Indonesia Party of Struggle.

Dr. Sjahrir stepped down as chairman of the party when the 2004 elected president of the Republic of Indonesia, Susilo Bambang Yudhoyono, appointed Syahrir as Economic Advisor to the President on 11 April 2007. He was succeeded by his wife, Dr. Nurmala Kartini Sjahrir, chairman of the Indonesian Anthropological Association (according to Minister of Law and Human Rights Republic of Indonesia decree number M.HH-08.AH.11.01 Year 2008)

On 28 July 2008, the party founder and first chairman, Dr. Syahrir, died in Singapore

On 10 November 2008, the party officially stated its candidate for the 2009 presidential election was incumbent President Susilo Bambang Yudhoyono

The party contested the 2009 elections, the party won only 0.2 percent of the vote, less than the 2.5 percent electoral threshold, meaning it was awarded no seats in the People's Representative Council.

== Vision and mission ==
The party vision and mission is to developed a new Indonesia which is fair, democratic and plural.

- Fair means jobs assurance, fair tax system, economic growth, elimination of poverty
- Democratic means human rights protection, justice for all, government transparency, people's control
- Plural means guarantee of the existence of various culture, freedom of speech, no discrimination, minority protection, freedom of religion.

== Election results ==
=== Presidential election results ===
Election	Ballot number	Candidate	Running mate	1st round (Total votes)	Share of votes	Outcome	2nd round (Total votes)	Share of votes	Outcome
2004	Neutral	Neutral				Neutral			
2009	2	Susilo Bambang Yudhoyono	Boediono	70,997,833	53.15%	Elected			

=== Legislative election results ===
Election	Ballot number	Leader	Seats		Votes		Outcome of election
Election	Ballot number	Leader	No.	±	Total	%	Outcome of election
2004	7	Sjahrir	0 / 550		672,592	0.59%	Governing coalition
2009	10	Kartini Sjahrir	0 / 560	0	198,803	0.19%	Governing coalition
