= Sunten Manurung =

Indonesian diplomat (born 1949)

Sunten Zephyrimus Manurung
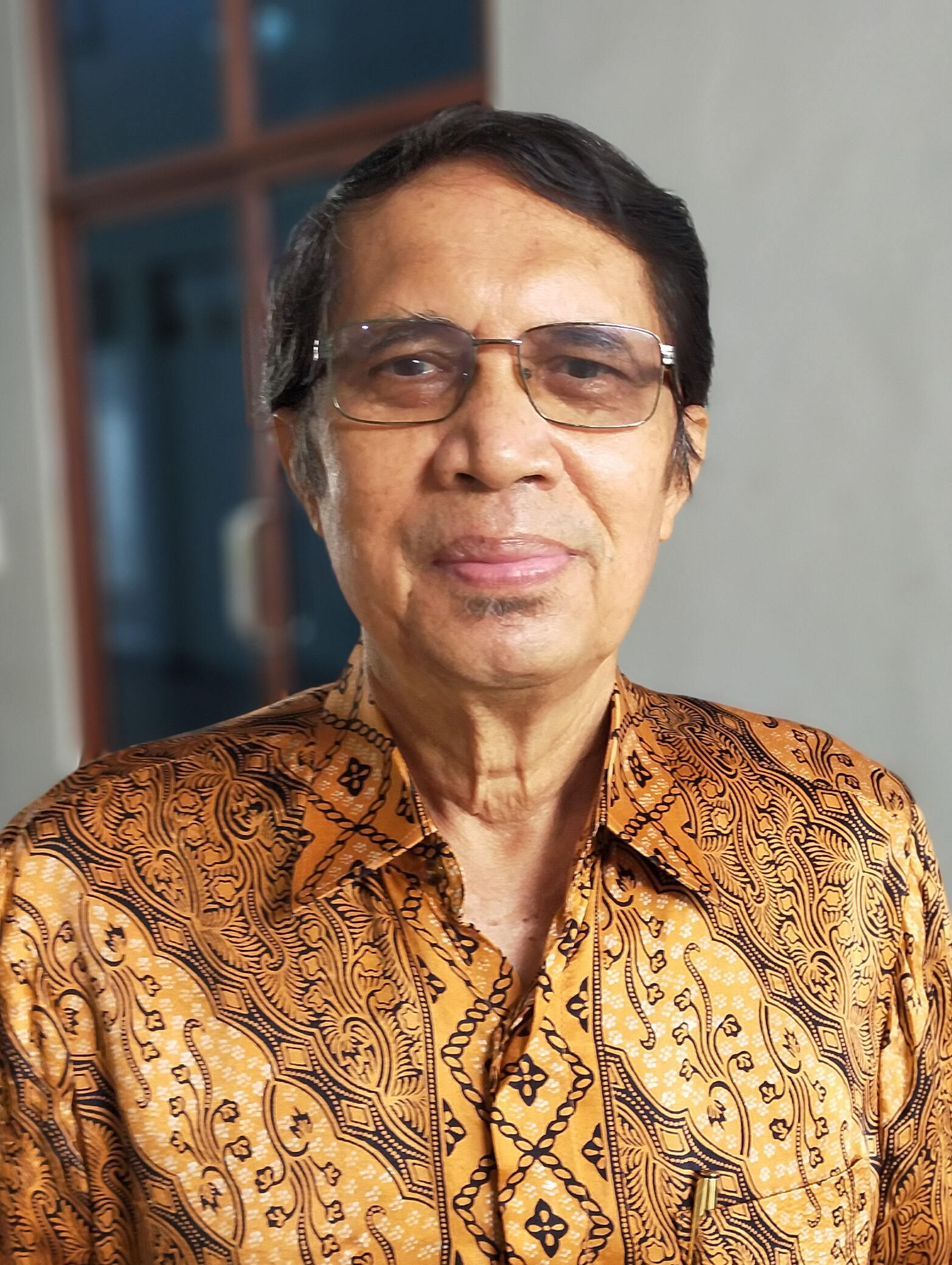

Ambassador of Indonesia to Argentina, Paraguay, and Uruguay
- In office 18 October 2006 – 30 April 2010
- President: Susilo Bambang Yudhoyono
- Preceded by: Max Pangemanan
- Succeeded by: Nurmala Kartini Sjahrir

Personal details
- Born: November 1, 1949 (age 76) Sirungkungon, North Sumatra, Indonesia
- Spouse: Herawaty (m. 1979)
- Children: 3
- Education: University of Indonesia (S.H.)

Sunten Zephyrimus Manurung (born 1 November 1949) is an Indonesian career diplomat who last served as ambassador to Argentina from 2006 to 2010. A graduate of the University of Indonesia, Sunten has served in the foreign ministry and abroad, including as director of West Europe and deputy chief of mission in Bangkok.

== Early life and education ==
Sunten was born on 1 November 1949, in Sirungkungon, North Sumatra, Indonesia. He studied law at the University of Indonesia and graduated in 1976. He has been married to Herawaty since 18 May 1979, and the couple has three children: one daughter and two sons.

== Diplomatic career ==
Sunten began his career in the diplomatic service in 1976 and underwent basic diplomatic education around that period. His early assignments included serving as the chief of the section in the directorate of foreign security from 1978 to 1982. During his tenure, in 1980 Sunten was part of a team that conducted research on the foreign ministry's headquarters, the Pancasila building. Following this, he moved into overseas roles, first as the third secretary and chief of the information section at the Indonesian embassy in Vientiane, Laos, until 1985, and subsequently as the second secretary for political affairs at the embassy in Tokyo, Japan, until 1987. Upon returning to Indonesia, he served as the deputy director for security affairs of the foreign ministry from 1987 to 1990.

The 1990s saw Manurung take on more senior roles. On 24 January 1991, Sunten began his role as the spokesperson at the consulate general in Los Angeles, serving with the diplomatic rank of counselor. He returned to Jakarta in 1995 to serve as the director for American affairs before being stationed at the embassy in London as the head of the political section with the rank of minister counsellor from 1997 to 2001.

In 2002, the foreign ministry underwent a massive reorganization, with two regional-based directorate generals being established to streamline reporting from embassies and representatives. Sunten was appointed as the director of West Europe, which was under the newly established Directorate General of America and Europe, on 1 March 2002. After two years, he was dispatched to Bangkok to serve as the deputy chief of mission with concurrent accreditation as Indonesia's deputy permanent representative to United Nations Economic and Social Commission for Asia and the Pacific. As the ambassador's post was vacant at the time of his arrival, he became the embassy's chargé d'affaires ad interim from January to October 2004. He resumed his posting as the embassy's second in command until 2006.

On 18 October 2006, Sunten was sworn in as ambassador to Argentina, with concurrent accreditation to Argentina and Paraguay. Sunten visited Batam to explore promotable potentials from the region before beginning his duties at the embassy on 8 December 2006. He presented his credentials to vice president Daniel Scioli of Argentina on 19 January 2007, president Tabaré Vázquez of Uruguay on 7 March 2007, and to president Francisco Oviedo of Paraguay on 20 February 2008. During his tenure, Sunten supported the presence of Indonesian missionaries in the country through visits to their place of residence, applauding their role in developing local residents. Sunten completed his ambassadorial duties on 30 April 2010, which was marked by a handover of duties to charge d'affaires ad interim Bindu Marbun.
