= Danantara =

Indonesian sovereign wealth fund

Dana Anagata Nusantara Indonesia Sovereign Fund
- Badan Pengelola Investasi Daya Anagata Nusantara

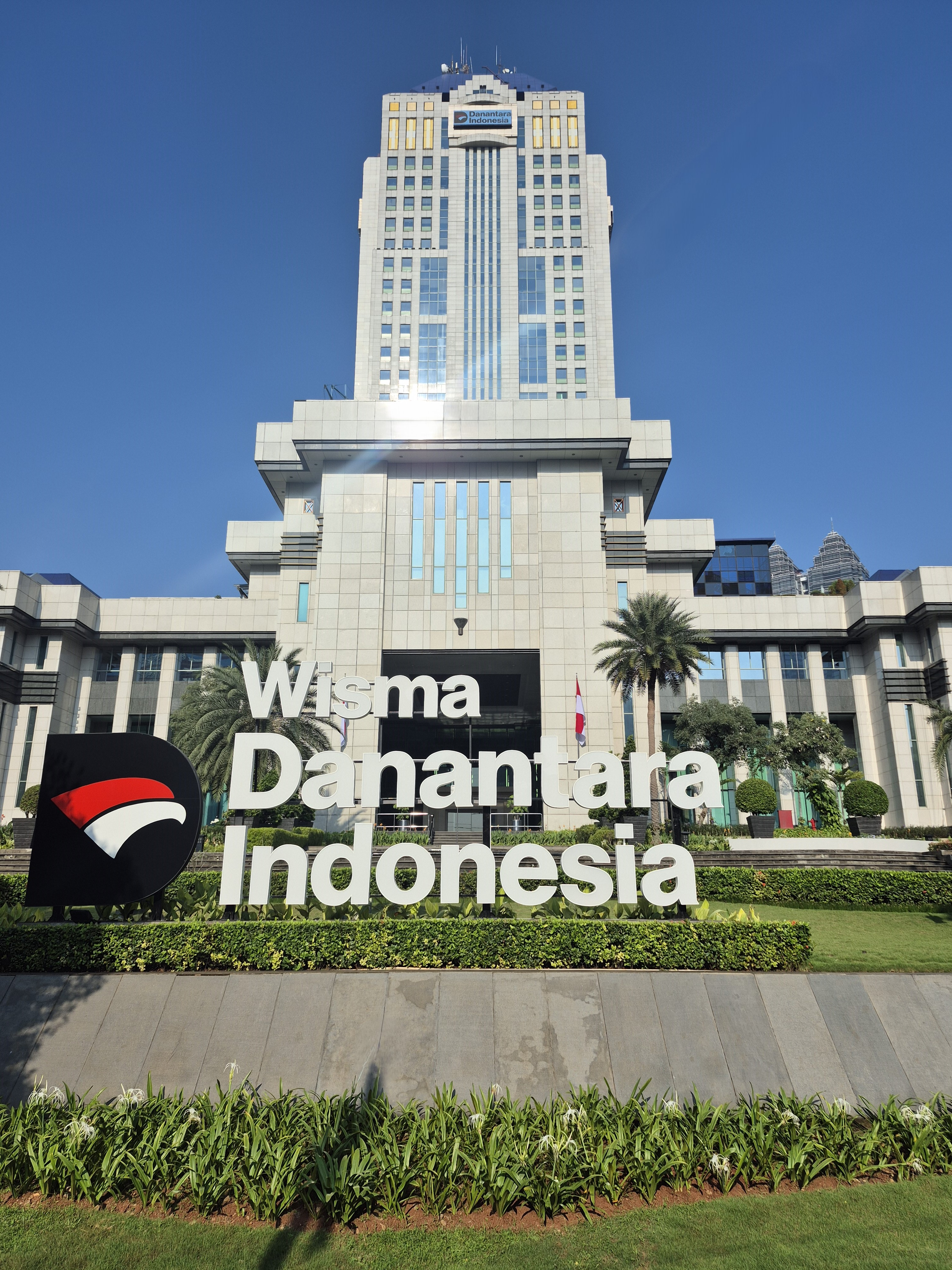
- Wisma Danantara (formerly Plaza Mandiri), the headquarters of Danantara, taken in 2025

Agency overview
- Formed: 24 February 2025; 19 months ago
- Preceding Agency: Ministry of State-Owned Enterprises (partial)
- Jurisdiction: Government of Indonesia
- Headquarters: Wisma Danantara Jl. Jend. Gatot Subroto No. 36–38 Central Jakarta, Indonesia
- Agency executives: Rosan Roeslani, CEO; Pandu Patria Sjahrir, CIO; Dony Oskaria, COO
- Child agencies: PT Danantara Asset Management (Persero); PT Danantara Investment Management (Persero)
- Website: danantaraindonesia.co.id

Daya Anagata Nusantara Investment Management Agency (Indonesian: Badan Pengelola Investasi Daya Anagata Nusantara), commonly known as Danantara Indonesia or simply Danantara, is the second sovereign wealth fund of Indonesia, after the Indonesia Investment Authority. The agency is led by a chairperson, currently Rosan Roeslani.

The agency is the fusion of certain functions between the Indonesia Investment Authority and the country's Ministry of State-Owned Enterprises.

== Etymology ==
Daya is an Indonesian word meaning "strength", "ability", or "effort", with origin traced from Sanskrit and Old Javanese. Anagata was taken either from Sanskrit or Pali, anāgata, meaning "not yet to come" or "future".

Nusantara is the Indonesian name for the region spanning the Indonesian archipelago. The word nūsa meaning "island" in Old Javanese was derived from the Proto-Malayo-Polynesian word *nusa with the same meaning, and the word antara is a Javanese loanword from Sanskrit, antarā, meaning "between" or "in the middle", thus creating a compound word of nūsa + antara. Together, it means "the outer islands" (from Java's perspective) as mentioned in the 14th century Old Javanese manuscript Pararaton and Nagarakretagama.

== History ==
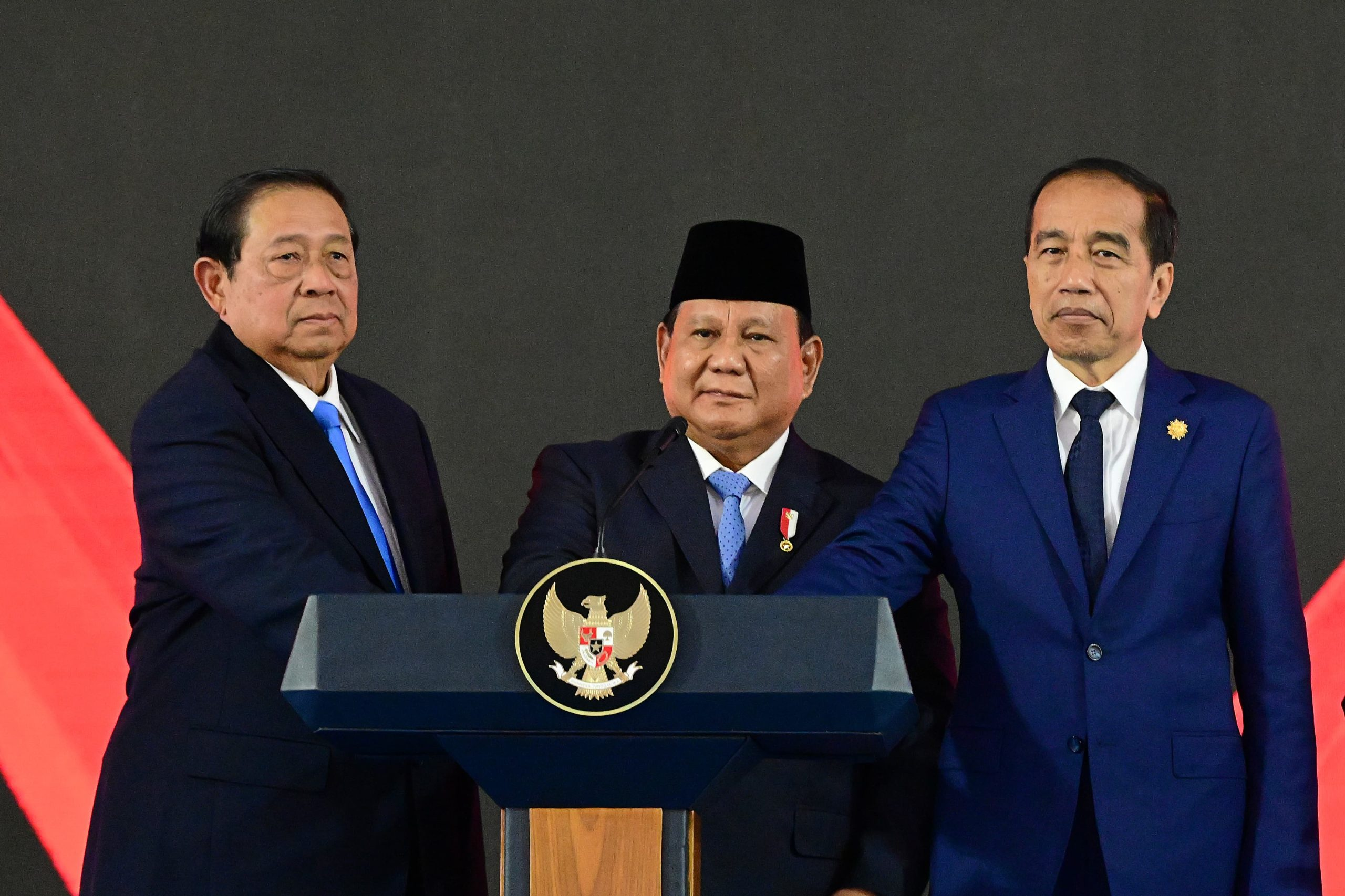
Launching of Danantara, left-to-right: former President Yudhoyono, incumbent President Prabowo, and former President Widodo.

Danantara was launched on 24 February 2025. From the initial stage, it is projected to have funding of IDR 320 trillion or US$20 billion and assets under management exceeding US$900 billion. Danantara is projected to be a global investment firm similar to—but larger than—Malaysia's Khazanah or Singapore's Temasek.

In mid-June 2025, representatives from Danantara and the Russian Direct Investment Fund signed an agreement at the 2025 St Petersburg International Economic Forum to create an investment fund worth 2 billion Euros (US$2.9 billion).

== Assets ==
Initially, at the beginning of Danantara formation, seven major state-owned enterprises were moved out of the Ministry of State-Owned Enterprises' direct management and placed under Danantara, including:

- Bank Mandiri
- Bank Negara Indonesia (BNI)
- Bank Rakyat Indonesia (BRI)
- Mineral Industri Indonesia (MIND ID)
- Pertamina
- Perusahaan Listrik Negara (PLN)
- Telekomunikasi Indonesia (Telkom)

When fully operated, all of the more than 1,000 (one thousand) state-owned enterprises were put under Danantara’s ownership and supervision with total assets under management exceeding IDR 14.72 quadrillion funds (US$900 billion).

== Organization ==
The following is the structure of Danantara:

- Person in Charge:
  - Minister of Investment and Industrial Downtreaming: Rosan Roeslani
- Supervisory Board:
  - Chairman: Erick Thohir
  - Deputy Chairman: Muliaman Darmansyah Hadad
  - Member: Minister of Finance
  - Member: Coordinating Minister for Political and Security
  - Member: Coordinating Minister for Economics Affairs
  - Member: Coordinating Minister for Legal, Human Rights, Immigration, and Correction
  - Member: Coordinating Minister for Infrastructure and Regional Development
  - Member: Coordinating Minister for Human Development and Cultural Affairs
  - Member: Coordinating Minister for Social Empowerment
  - Member: Coordinating Minister for Food Affairs
  - Member: State Secretariat
- Coordination Committee:
  - Sixth President of Indonesia: Susilo Bambang Yudhoyono
  - Seventh President of Indonesia: Joko Widodo
- Advisory Board:
  - Chairman: Ray Dalio
  - Member: Helman Sitohang
  - Member: Jeffrey Sachs
  - Member: Chapman Taylor
  - Member: Thaksin Shinawatra
- Supervisory and Accountability Committee:
  - Chairman of Indonesian Financial Transaction Reports and Analysis Center
  - Chairman of Corruption Eradication Commission
  - Chairman of Financial and Development Supervisory Board
  - Chairman of the Audit Board of Indonesia
  - Chief of the Indonesian National Police
  - Attorney General
- Managing Board
  - Head of Managing Agency / Chief Executive Officer (CEO): Rosan Roeslani
  - Investment Holding / Chief Investment Officer (CIO): Pandu Patria Sjahrir
  - Holding Operations / Chief Operating Officer (COO): Dony Oskaria

Danantara Managing Committee organized into the following:

Managing Directors:

- Managing Director Legal: Robertus Billitea
- Managing Director Risk and Sustainability: Lieng-Seng Wee
- Managing Director Finance: Arief Budiman
- Managing Director Treasury: Ali Setiawan
- Managing Director Global Relations and Governance: Mohamad Al-Arief
- Managing Director Stakeholders Management: Rohan Hafas
- Managing Director Internal Audit: Ahmad Hidayat
- Managing Director Human Resources: Sanjay Bharwani
- Managing Director / Chief Economist: Reza Yamora Siregar
- Managing Director Head Of Office: Ivy Santoso
- Managing Director Technology and Innovation: Sigit Puji Santosa

Risk Management Committee: John Prasetio
Investment and Portfolio Committee: Yup Kim

Operational Holding under COO

- Managing Director: Agus Dwi Handaya
- Managing Director: Febriany Eddy
- Managing Director: Riko Banardi

Investment Holding under CIO

- Managing Director Finance: Djamal Attamimi
- Managing Director Legal: Bono Daru Adji
- Managing Director Investment: Stefanus Ade Hadiwidjaja

== Economic Impact ==
On 24 February 2025, Eddy Junarsin, an economist from Gadjah Mada University (UGM), optimistically stated that Danantara would accountably and transparently strengthen the state-owned asset governance from state-owned enterprises. By using concepts of holding company, it would improve the governance of the SOEs, which were previously fragmented. Danantara is expected to maintain the stability of national finances in the long term. Junarsin wants Danantara to merge and acquire inefficient companies and establish a less layered management structure so that SOEs will be more agile in innovation. However, on the other hand, Junarsin is also viewed that Danantara was established during escalating socio-political issues, such as the 2025 budget efficiency, Free Nutritious Meals, the revision of the Mineral and Coal act, among others.

== Patriot Bond Initiative ==
In August 2025, Danantara launched the "Patriot Bond" initiative to raise Rp50 trillion, with the stated goal of funding waste-to-energy projects. The offering drew controversy for its 2% interest rate, which was substantially below the market rate of nearly 6% for comparable government bonds.

Due to the uncompetitive financial terms, financial analysts and critics widely viewed the initiative as a political instrument rather than a commercial one. The offering was described as an insurance policy or loyalty test for the nation's business elite, with the implicit return for investors being political goodwill rather than financial gain. The strategy fueled concerns that Danantara was leveraging political pressure for fundraising, undermining its image as a commercially independent entity. Several wealthy businessmen are reported to have agreed to invest 2-3 trillion IDR each.

== Controversies ==
=== Mismanagement concerns ===
Concerns about the management and transparency of the entity were raised due to the inability of national auditors namely the Financial Audit Board (BPK), the Agency for Financial and Development Supervision (BPKP), as well as the Corruption Eradication Commission (KPK) to monitor the managed assets. However, audits may be made upon request from the House of Representatives. Indonesian public spheres and mass media concerned about the future fate of Danantara may look to 1Malaysia Development Bhd. (1MDB) for a relevant example.

Deni Friawan, a researcher from the Centre for Strategic and International Studies (CSIS), argued that the success of Danantara may depend on factors such as independence, transparency, professionalism in its management and support for clear business orientation. He compared it to Singapore's Temasek Holdings, whose officials have close connections to the government, but still maintain their independence and professionalism.

On 24 March 2025, former Thai prime minister (2001–2006) Thaksin Shinawatra was appointed as a Danantara advisory board member. However, he and his family were involved in several scandals and corruptions in Thailand.

=== Concurrent position issues ===
The concurrent position issues among state-owned enterprise commissioners has been under discussion, even before Danantara was established. Since the end of 2008, Minister of Finance Sri Mulyani has prohibited any civil servants within the Ministry of Finance, particularly those of echelon I rank, from holding concurrent positions as a commissioner of state- or private-owned enterprises, based on a joint decree between the Minister of Finance, the Minister of Administrative and Bureaucratic Reform, and the Minister of State-Owned Enterprises. However, this attempt does not completely successful in suppressing conflict of interest in government. In 2023, Indonesia Corruption Watch (ICW) reported that between 2016 and 2019, 397 SOE commissioners and 167 SOE subsidiary commissioners were suspected of holding concurrent positions, which violates 2003 State-Owned Enterprises Act. According to ICW, these cases of concurrent positions leave commissioners trapped in conflicts of interest and threaten good corporate governance. ICW highlighted that incompetent oversighting can lead SOEs into corruption.

On 16 July 2025, Transparency International (TI) Indonesia continues to find cases of deputy ministers holding concurrent positions as commissioners of SOEs. TI Indonesia Secretary General Danang Widoyoko acknowledged that SOEs are inextricably linked to political interferences, particularly in the appointment of top management, including commissioners. He even suggested this trend would extend to the board of directors, creating a burden for SOEs and weakening GCGs. At the time, TI Indonesia noted that in addition to Danantara's leadership, which is largely filled by political elites, several SOEs had appointed deputy ministers as SOEs commissioners (as of 16 July 2025):

- Pertamina and its subsidiaries, recruited 6 deputy ministers to serve as commissioners.
- PLN and its subsidiaries, recruited 4 deputy ministers to serve as commissioners.
- Pupuk Indonesia Holding Co. and its subsidiaries, recruited 2 deputy ministers to serve as commissioners.
- Garuda Indonesia and its subsidiaries, recruited 2 deputy ministers to serve as commissioners.
- Three deputy ministers serve as commissioners in Bank Mandiri, Bank BTN, and Bank BRI
- Nine deputy ministers serve as commissioners in several state-owned enterprises: Perikanan Indonesia, Pelindo, Dahana, SIG, Sarinah, Jasa Marga, Indosat, and InJourney Aviation Services.

The House Speaker of the House of Representatives Sufmi Dasco Ahmad views that Indonesian president Prabowo Subianto placed the deputy ministers as commissioners of SOEs as "government representatives". He stated that the deputy ministers appointed as commissioners of SOEs would not receive any benefits or bonuses. According to ICW, even though they would not receive a bonus, holding concurrent position as both deputy minister and commissioner of an SOE violates Article 27B of the SOEs Act and Article 23 of the Government Ministry Act, as well as the Constitutional Court decision No. 80/PUU-XVII/2019 on prohibition of concurrent positions for deputy ministers, as well as Art. 73(2) Minister of SOEs' Regulation No. PER-3/MBU/03/2023.

In July 2025, Danantara issued letter No. S-063/DI-BP/VII/2025, which prohibits all members of the Board of Commissioners of SOEs and their subsidiaries from receiving any bonuses, incentives, or other income linked to company performance. Meanwhile, incentives for directors remain permitted, provided they are based on genuine and sustainable performance and do not stem from short-term gains, such as revaluations or asset sales.

== See also ==
- Silk Road Fund
