= LQ45 =

Indonesian stock market index

- Operator: PT Bursa Efek Indonesia
- Exchanges: Indonesia Stock Exchange (IDX)
- Constituents: 45
- Weighting method: Capitalization-weighted
- Related indices: IDX Composite (IHSG)

LQ45 is a stock market index for the Indonesia Stock Exchange (IDX) (formerly known as the Jakarta Stock Exchange). The LQ45 index consists of 45 companies that:

- have been included in the top 60 companies with the highest market capitalization in the last 12 months
- have been included in the top 60 companies with the highest transaction value in a regular market in the last 12 months
- have been listed in the Indonesia Stock Exchange for at least 3 months
- have good financial conditions, prospect of growth, high transaction value and frequency

It is calculated semi-annually by the research and development division of the Indonesia Stock Exchange.

== Components ==
For the period of August to October 2026, the LQ45 index is composed of the following companies:

Ticker	Company
IDX: AADI	Adaro Andalan Indonesia Tbk.
IDX: ADMR	Alamtri Minerals Indonesia Tbk.
IDX: ADRO	Alamtri Resources Indonesia Tbk.
IDX: AKRA	AKR Corporindo Tbk.
IDX: AMMN	Amman Mineral Internasional Tbk.
IDX: AMRT	Sumber Alfaria Trijaya Tbk.
IDX: ANTM	Aneka Tambang Tbk.
IDX: ASII	Astra International Tbk.
IDX: BBCA	Bank Central Asia Tbk.
IDX: BBNI	Bank Negara Indonesia (Persero) Tbk.
IDX: BBRI	Bank Rakyat Indonesia (Persero) Tbk.
IDX: BBTN	Bank Tabungan Negara (Persero) Tbk.
IDX: BMRI	Bank Mandiri (Persero) Tbk.
IDX: BRPT	Barito Pacific Tbk.
IDX: BUMI	Bumi Resources Tbk.
IDX: CPIN	Charoen Pokphand Indonesia Tbk.
IDX: CUAN	Petrindo Jaya Kreasi Tbk.
IDX: DEWA	Darma Henwa Tbk.
IDX: EMTK	Elang Mahkota Teknologi Tbk.
IDX: ESSA	ESSA Industries Indonesia Tbk.
IDX: EXCL	XLSMART Telecom Sejahtera Tbk.
IDX: GOTO	GoTo Gojek Tokopedia Tbk.
IDX: HRTA	Hartadinata Abadi Tbk.
IDX: ICBP	Indofood CBP Sukses Makmur Tbk.
IDX: INCO	Vale Indonesia Tbk.
IDX: INDF	Indofood Sukses Makmur Tbk.
IDX: INDY	Indika Energy Tbk.
IDX: INKP	Indah Kiat Pulp & Paper Tbk.
IDX: ISAT	Indosat Tbk.
IDX: ITMG	Indo Tambangraya Megah Tbk.
IDX: JPFA	Japfa Comfeed Indonesia Tbk.
IDX: KLBF	Kalbe Farma Tbk.
IDX: MAPI	Mitra Adiperkasa Tbk.
IDX: MBMA	Merdeka Battery Materials Tbk.
IDX: MDKA	Merdeka Copper Gold Tbk.
IDX: MEDC	Medco Energi Internasional Tbk.
IDX: PGAS	Pertamina Gas Negara Tbk.
IDX: PGEO	Pertamina Geothermal Energy Tbk
IDX: PTBA	Bukit Asam Tbk.
IDX: SCMA	Surya Citra Media Tbk.
IDX: TLKM	Telkom Indonesia (Persero) Tbk.
IDX: UNTR	United Tractors Tbk.
IDX: UNVR	Unilever Indonesia Tbk.
IDX: WIFI	Solusi Sinergi Digital Tbk.

== See also ==
- IDX Composite
