= Bank Maybank Indonesia =

Financial institution based in Indonesia

PT Bank Maybank Indonesia Tbk
- Formerly: Bank Internasional Indonesia (1959–2015)
- Type: Public
- Traded as: IDX: BNII
- Industry: Financial services, Banking
- Founded: 15 May 1959; 67 years ago
- Headquarters: Jakarta, Indonesia
- Area served: Indonesia; Cayman Islands; Mauritius; India (Mumbai)
- Products: Retail banking Global banking Business banking Global market Syariah
- Services: Tabungan; Giro; Deposito; Pinjaman; Investasi
- Revenue: ▲ Rp 3 trillion (2018)
- Total assets: ▲ Rp169.1 trillion (2019)
- Owner: Maybank
- Number of employees: > 8000 (2018)
- Subsidiaries: WOM Finance; Maybank Finance
- Website: www.maybank.co.id

PT Bank Maybank Indonesia Tbk, (formerly Bank Internasional Indonesia) is a private bank in Indonesia. It is a part of Maybank, one of the largest financial services groups in ASEAN.

== History ==
Former logo from 1997

It was founded on 15 May 1959 by Aridi Penjamin and Jap Ing Hoat. Later, a key figure and owner was Iskandar Widyadi . The bank obtained its license as a foreign exchange bank in 1988. The company then became publicly listed in the Jakarta Stock Exchange and Surabaya Stock Exchange (now merged as the Indonesia Stock Exchange) in 1989. In August 2005, Sinar Mas group became the owner.

== Services ==
Maybank Indonesia provides a comprehensive range of products and services for individual and corporate customers through Community Financial Services (Retail and Non-Retail Banking) and Global Banking, as well as automotive financing through its subsidiaries, WOM Finance for two wheelers and Maybank Finance for four wheelers.

Maybank Indonesia continues to develop digital banking services and capacity through Mobile Banking, Internet Banking, Maybank2U (internet-based mobile banking) and various other channels.

As of 31 December 2019, Maybank Indonesia maintained 374 branches including Sharia branches spread across Indonesia and one overseas branch (Mumbai, India), 21 Mobile Cash Vehicles and 1,571 ATMs including CDM (Cash Deposit Machines) connected with over 20,000 ATMs in ATM PRIMA, ATM BERSAMA, ALTO, CIRRUS and connected to 3,500 Maybank ATMs in Singapore, Malaysia and Brunei.

By the end of 2019, Maybank Indonesia managed Rp110.6 trillion in customer deposits and Rp169.1 trillion in assets.
