= Jakarta Islamic Index =

Stock market index in Indonesia

The Jakarta Islamic Index (JII) is a stock market index established on July 3, 2000 on the Indonesia Stock Exchange (IDX) (formerly known as Jakarta Stock Exchange) to help facilitate the trading of public companies according to Syariah business code. Following Islamic law prohibits a company from involving itself in activities related to gambling, speculation, and traditional banking and financing. The JII may not list equities that produce or distribute food, drink, or morally harmful items that stand in contradiction with Islamic values.

Unlike the Indonesian Syariah Stock Index (ISSI) that lists all IDX stocks that meet the Syariah code, stocks listed under the JII must meet procedural standards as well as performance requirements, such as:

- The share must be listed on the exchange for at least three months prior to application.
- The company’s annual or mid-year financial report must have an Obligation Asset ratio of no more than 90%.
- Rank in the top 60 shares based on the previous year’s average Market Capitalization.
- Rank in the top 30 shares based on the previous year’s average liquidity in the regular market.

A reevaluation of the listed shares is held biannually and the results are publicized in May and in November.

== Components ==
As of 1 December 2020, the Jakarta Islamic Index contained 30 publicly traded companies:

1. AlamTri Resources (ADRO)
2. AKR Corporindo Tbk. (AKRA)
3. Aneka Tambang (Persero) Tbk. (ANTM)
4. Barito Pacific Tbk. (BRPT)
5. Bank BTPN Syariah Tbk. (BTPN)
6. Charoen Pokphand Indonesia Tbk. (CPIN)
7. XL Axiata Tbk. (EXCL)
8. Indofood CBP Sukses Makmur Tbk. (ICBP)
9. Vale Indonesia Tbk. (INCO)
10. Indofood Sukses Makmur Tbk. (INDF)
11. Indah Kiat Pulp & Paper Tbk. (INKP)
12. Indocement Tunggal Prakarsa Tbk. (INTP)
13. Japfa Comfeed Indonesia Tbk. (JPFA)
14. Kimia Farma Tbk. (KAEF)
15. Kalbe Farma Tbk. (KAEF)
16. Merdeka Copper Gold Tbk. (MDKA)
17. Mitra Keluarga Karyasehat Tbk. (MIKA)
18. Media Nusantara Citra Tbk. (MNCN)
19. Perusahaan Gas Negara Tbk. (PGAS)
20. Bukit Asam Tbk. (PTBA)
21. PP (Persero) Tbk. (PTPP)
22. Pakuwon Jati Tbk. (PWON)
23. Surya Citra Media Tbk. (SCMA)
24. Semen Indonesia (Persero) Tbk. (SMGR)
25. Pabrik Kertas Tjiwi Kimia Tbk. (TKIM)
26. Telekomunikasi Indonesia (Persero) Tbk. (TLKM)
27. Chandra Asri Petrochemical Tbk. (TPIA)
28. United Tractors Tbk. (UNTR)
29. Unilever Indonesia Tbk. (UNVR)
30. Wijaya Karya (Persero) Tbk. (WIKA)
