= PGN =

PGN may refer to:

- Paignton railway station, National Rail station code PGN
- Parameter Group Number, as defined in the Society of Automotive Engineers J1939 standard
- Peptidoglycan, a polymer consisting of sugars and amino acids that forms a bacterial cell wall
- Pertamina Gas Negara, a natural gas transportation and distribution company in Indonesia
- Philadelphia Gay News, a newspaper in the Philadelphia area, Pennsylvania, United States
- Portable Game Notation, a computer data format for recording chess games
- Peter G. Neumann, American computer scientist (1932–2026), popularly known as PGN
