= Antam =

Indonesian mining company

PT Aneka Tambang Tbk.

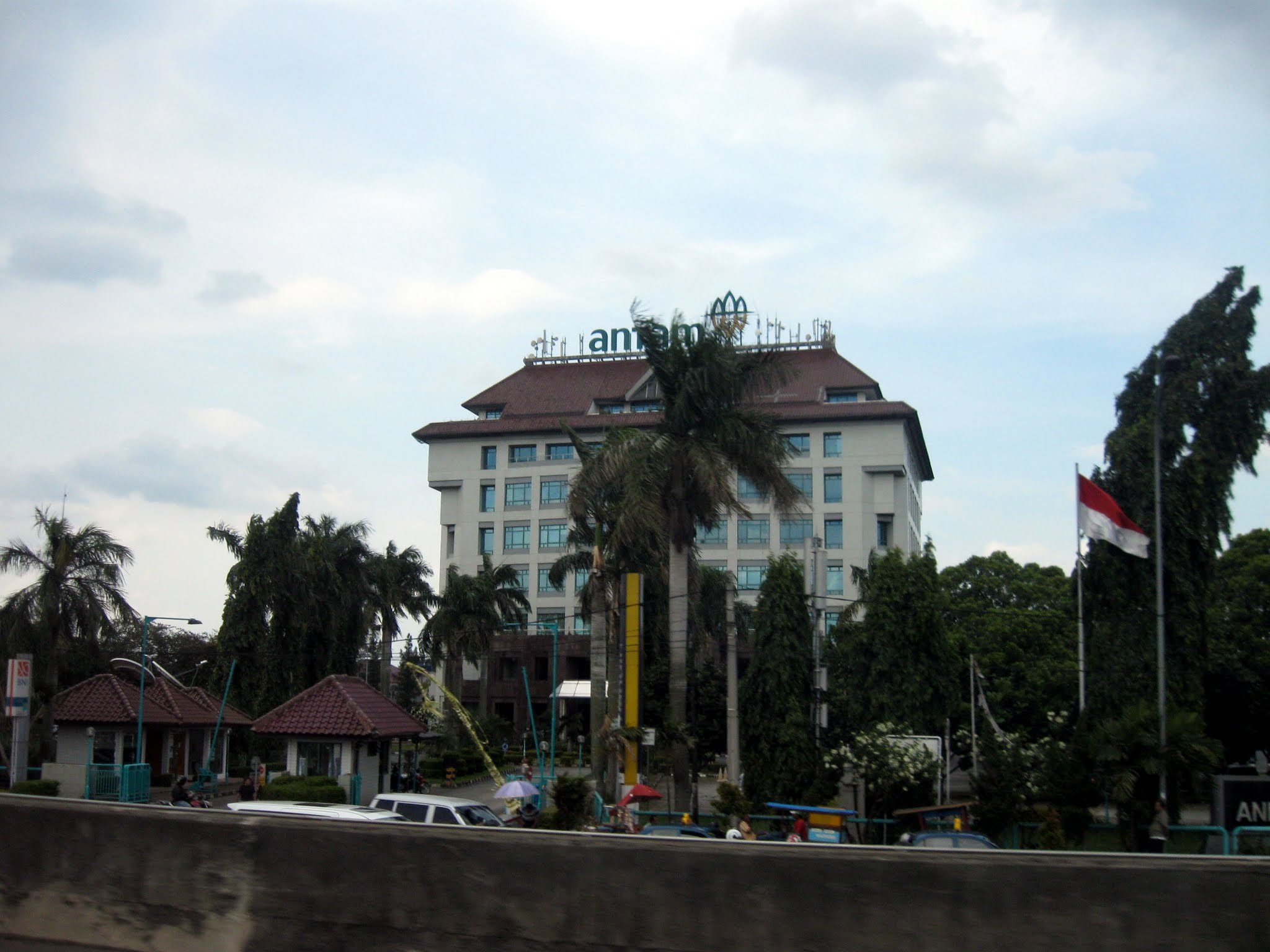
- Antam headquarters in Jakarta
- Company type: Public
- Traded as: IDX: ANTM; ASX: ATM
- Industry: Mining; Metallurgy
- Founded: 1968
- Headquarters: Jakarta, Indonesia
- Revenue: ▲ Rp 25.2 trillion (2018)
- Net income: ▲ Rp 874 billion (2018)
- Owner: PT Mineral Industri Indonesia (Persero)
- Number of employees: 2,598
- Website: antam.com

PT Aneka Tambang Tbk, colloquially known as Antam, is an Indonesian mining company. The company primarily produces gold and nickel, and is the largest producer of nickel in Indonesia. Until 2017, Antam was a directly state-owned company, before its ownership was transferred to PT Mineral Industri Indonesia (Persero) or MIND ID, a government-owned holding company.

== History ==
Antam was established in 1968 by the Indonesian government under Suharto by merging multiple state-owned mining companies. It became a limited company in 1974, and began listing in the Jakarta Stock Exchange in 1997. In 2017, its ownership was transferred from the Indonesian government (which controlled 65 percent of the company's shares) to Inalum in a move intended to create a national holding company.

Due to a government ban on the export of unprocessed ores, Antam began construction of smelter facilities for ferronickel and alumina.

In 2020, it was announced that Antam would form a joint venture with Pertamina and PLN to form an electric vehicle battery company, to be dubbed Indonesia Baterai. Antam's position in the venture is as a provider of upstream raw materials and metals. There are plans for the company to partner with Contemporary Amperex Technology and LG Energy Solution in two projects worth US$ 12 billion.

In January 2025, six former Antam executives were charged with corruption for alleged mismanagement and fraudulent activities involving 109 tons of gold between 2010 and 2022, causing losses of Rp3.31 trillion ($203.19 million). The London Bullion Market Association is also reviewing the allegations against Antam. Antam denies producing counterfeit gold.

== Operations ==
As of 2015, Antam was a producer of bauxite, ferronickel, gold, nickel and silver. It is Indonesia's largest producer of nickel, and it lost considerable amounts of revenue and profits following a nickel ore ban. Antam's gold operations was the primary contributor of the company's revenue, making up 71 percent of its Q1 2018 revenue. Antam is the only Indonesian gold refiner to be accredited by the London Bullion Market Association.
