= Eagle High Plantations =

Company of Indonesia

- Formerly: BW Plantation (2007-2014); PT Bumi Perdana Prima Internasional (2000-2007)
- Company type: Public
- Traded as: IDX: BWPT
- Industry: Plantation, Agribusiness
- Founded: 2000; 25 years ago
- Headquarters: Jakarta, Indonesia
- Products: Palm oil

Eagle High Plantations, formerly known as BW Plantation, is an Indonesian company active in oil palm plantations and palm oil manufacturing. It is listed since 2009 on the Indonesia Stock Exchange as BWPT.

== History ==
The company was established in 2000 under the name PT Bumi Perdana Prima Internasional. In 2007 it changed its name to BW Plantation. It had its initial public offering in 2009. Despite risen sales, its profits plunged in 2013. In 2014 the company acquired Green Eagle Group and changed its name to Eagle High Plantations.

== Organization ==
BW Plantation had 89,000 hectares of plantations in Central Kalimantan, East Kalimantan and West Kalimantan. Abdul Halim Ashari was its President Director. It has four palm oil mills in Central Kalimantan. It is based in Jakarta. Its subsidiaries include PT Bumilanggeng Perdanatrada, PT Adhyaksa Dharmasatya, PT Sawit Sukses Sejahtera, PT Wana Catur Jaya Utama, PT Satria Manunggal Sejahtera and PT Agrolestari Kencana Makmur.

== Controversy ==
A subsidiary of BW Plantation has cleared forest habitat of the orangutan.
