= IDX Composite =

Stocks index

The IDX Composite (Indonesian: Indeks Harga Saham Gabungan, lit. 'Combined Stock Prices Index', IHSG) is a stock index of all stocks listed on the Indonesia Stock Exchange, IDX. It was known as JSX Composite as a stock index of all stocks listed on Jakarta Stock Exchange, JSX (the predecessor of Indonesia Stock Exchange, IDX).

== Annual Returns ==
The following table shows the annual development of the IDX Composite since 1982.

Year	Closing level	Change in index in points	Change in index in %
1982	95.00		
1983	85.62	−9.38	−9.87
1984	67.68	−17.94	−20.95
1985	66.53	−1.15	−1.70
1986	69.69	3.16	4.75
1987	82.58	12.89	18.50
1988	305.12	222.54	269.48
1989	399.69	94.57	30.99
1990	417.79	18.10	4.53
1991	247.39	−170.40	−40.79
1992	274.34	26.95	10.89
1993	588.77	314.43	114.61
1994	469.64	−122.62	−20.83
1995	513.85	47.70	10.23
1996	637.43	123.58	24.05
1997	401.71	−235.72	−36.98
1998	398.04	−3.68	−0.92
1999	676.92	278.89	70.07
2000	413.58	−263.34	−38.90
2001	392.04	−21.55	−5.21
2002	424.95	32.91	8.39
2003	691.90	266.95	62.82
2004	1,000.23	308.33	44.56
2005	1,162.64	162.41	16.24
2006	1,805.52	642.88	55.29
2007	2,745.83	940.31	52.08
2008	1,355.41	−1,390.42	−50.64
2009	2,534.36	1,178.95	86.98
2010	3,703.51	1,169.15	46.13
2011	3,821.99	118.48	3.20
2012	4,316.69	494.70	12.94
2013	4,274.18	−42.51	−0.98
2014	5,226.95	952.77	22.29
2015	4,593.00	−633.95	−12.13
2016	5,296.71	703.71	15.32
2017	6,355.65	1,058.94	19.99
2018	6,194.50	−161.15	−2.54
2019	6,299.54	105.04	1.70
2020	5,979.07	−320.47	−5.09
2021	6,581.48	602.41	10.08
2022	6,850.62	269.14	4.09
2023	7,272.80	422.18	6.16
2024	7,079.90	−192.9	−2.65
2025	8,646.94	1,567.03	22.13

== Records ==
Category	All-time highs	
Closing	9,134.70	Tuesday, 20 January 2026
Intraday	9,174.47	Tuesday, 20 January 2026
ATH in 2026	January	9x (2nd, 5th, 6th, 7th, 13th, 14th, 15th, 19th, 20th)

== Milestones ==
The following is a timeline on the rise of the IDX Composite through Indonesian stock market history.

Milestone	Date	Closing
800	20 April 2004	810.86
900	9 November 2004	901.38
1000	28 December 2004	1003.92
1100	23 February 2005	1102.93
1200	4 January 2006	1211.70
1300	17 March 2006	1305.18
1400	18 April 2006	1417.38
1500	8 May 2006	1507.93
1600	2 November 2006	1607.70
1700	22 November 2006	1705.44
1800	27 December 2006	1803.26
1900	4 April 2007	1922.05
2000	26 April 2007	2016.03
2100	23 May 2007	2104.25
2200	5 July 2007	2220.93
2300	13 July 2007	2301.60
2400	24 July 2007	2401.14
2500	5 October 2007	2500.58
2600	11 October 2007	2638.21
2700	1 November 2007	2704.66
2800	11 December 2007	2810.96
2900	15 April 2010	2900.53
3000	21 July 2010	3013.40
3100	19 August 2010	3105.35
3200	6 September 2010	3217.15
3300	15 September 2010	3357.03
3400	27 September 2010	3468.04
3500	30 September 2010	3501.30
3600	6 October 2010	3603.40
3700	9 November 2010	3737.48
3800	21 April 2011	3801.08
3900	1 July 2011	3927.10
4000	8 July 2011	4003.69
4100	22 July 2011	4106.82
4200	3 April 2012	4215.44
4300	5 October 2012	4311.31
4400	4 January 2013	4410.02
4500	7 February 2013	4503.15
4600	15 February 2013	4609.79
4700	27 February 2013	4716.42
4800	1 March 2013	4811.61
4900	27 March 2013	4928.10
5000	18 April 2013	5012.64
5100	10 May 2013	5105.94
5200	20 May 2013	5214.98
5300	23 January 2015	5323.88
5400	20 February 2015	5400.10
5500	6 March 2015	5514.79
5600	3 April 2017	5606.79
5700	26 April 2017	5726.53
5800	21 June 2017	5818.55
5900	3 July 2017	5910.24
6000	25 October 2017	6025.43
6100	14 December 2017	6113.65
6200	22 December 2017	6221.01
6300	28 December 2017	6314.05
6400	16 January 2018	6429.69
6500	22 January 2018	6500.53
6600	23 January 2018	6635.33
6700	19 November 2021	6720.26
6800	7 February 2022	6804.94
6900	21 February 2022	6902.96
7000	22 March 2022	7000.82
7100	4 April 2022	7116.22
7200	8 April 2022	7210.84
7300	13 September 2022	7318.02
7400	13 March 2024	7421.21
7500	20 August 2024	7533.98
7600	26 August 2024	7606.20
7700	6 September 2024	7721.85
7800	13 September 2024	7812.13
7900	19 September 2024	7905.39
8000	17 September 2025	8,025.18
8100	23 September 2025	8,125.20
8200	9 October 2025	8,250.94
8300	5 November 2025	8,318.53
8400	17 November 2025	8,416.88
8500	24 November 2025	8,570.25
8600	26 November 2025	8,602.13
8700	8 December 2025	8,710.70
8800	5 January 2026	8,859.19
8900	6 January 2026	8,933.61
9000	14 January 2026	9,032.58
9100	19 January 2026	9,133.87

== Largest Percentage and Points Changes ==
From CNBC Indonesia, there are five days when Indonesian Stock Exchange up more than 10% in a day. Also, there are another Top-5 most points gains and lose in a single day since the data gathered from 1998.

Largest Daily Percentage Gains
Rank	Date	Close	Gain	%
1	2 February 1998	554.11	+68.17	+14.03
2	8 June 1999	686.95	+74.57	+12.18
3	5 September 1997	594.11	+60.24	+11.28
4	16 October 1998	337.59	+32.74	+10.74
5	26 March 2020	4338.9	+401.27	+10.19
6	13 January 1998	382.14	+31.9	+9.11
7	8 October 1998	288.55	+22.38	+8.41
8	23 January 2008	2,476.28	+181.75	+7.92
9	3 November 2008	1,352.72	+96.01	+7.64
10	15 December 2008	1,359.28	+96.31	+7.63

Largest Daily Point Gains				
Rank	Date	Close	Gains	%
1	9 June 2026	5,746.65	+404.51	+7.57
2	26 March 2020	4,338.90	+401.27	+10.19
3	8 April 2026	7,279.21	+308.18	+4.42
4	10 April 2025	6,254.02	+286.04	+4.79
5	20 October 2026	5,278.89	+282.28	+5.65
Largest Daily Point Losses				
Rank	Date	Close	Losses	%
1	16 October 2026	5,185.11	−678.68	−11.57
2	28 January 2026	8,320.56	−659.67	−7.35
3	8 April 2025	5,996.14	−514.48	−7.90
4	2 February 2026	7,922.73	−406.88	−4.88
5	4 March 2026	7,577.07	−362.70	−4.57

== Components ==
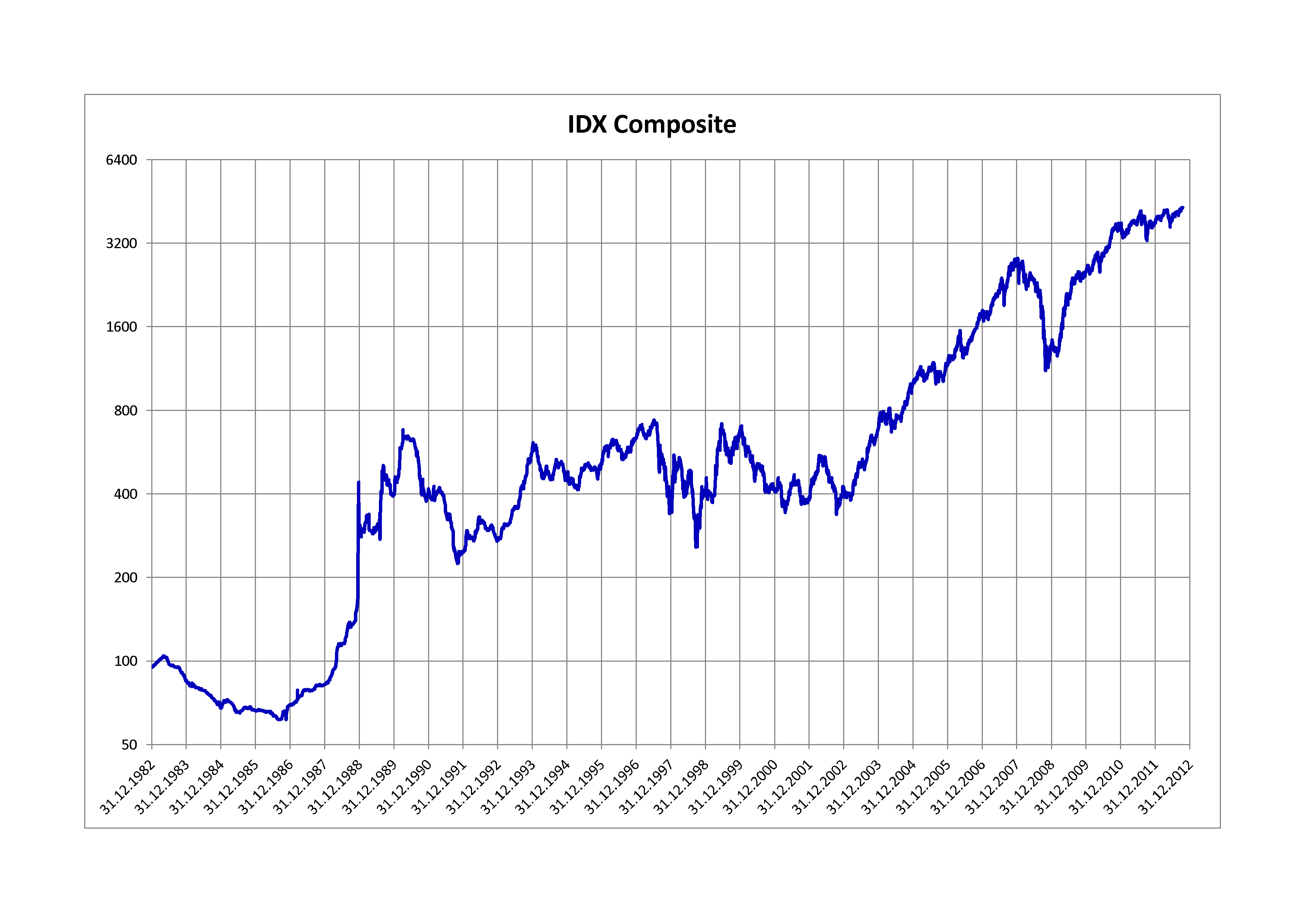
IDX Composite 1982–2012

Indonesia Stock Exchange currently lists 820 companies.

No	Code	Company Name
1	AIMS	Akbar Indo Makmur Stimec Tbk
2	AISA	FKS Food Sejahtera Tbk.
3	AKKU	Anugerah Kagum Karya Utama Tbk
4	AKPI	Argha Karya Prima Industry Tbk
5	AKRA	AKR Corporindo Tbk.
6	AKSI	Mineral Sumberdaya Mandiri Tbk
7	ALDO	Alkindo Naratama Tbk.
8	ALKA	Alakasa Industrindo Tbk
9	ALMI	Alumindo Light Metal Industry
10	ALTO	Tri Banyan Tirta Tbk.
11	AMAG	Asuransi Multi Artha Guna Tbk.
12	AMFG	Asahimas Flat Glass Tbk.
13	AMIN	Ateliers Mecaniques D Indonesia
14	AMRT	Sumber Alfaria Trijaya Tbk.
15	ANJT	Austindo Nusantara Jaya Tbk.
16	ANTM	Aneka Tambang Tbk.
17	APEX	Apexindo Pratama Duta Tbk.
18	APIC	Pacific Strategic Financial Tb
19	APII	Arita Prima Indonesia Tbk.
20	APLI	Asiaplast Industries Tbk.
21	APLN	Agung Podomoro Land Tbk.
22	ARGO	Argo Pantes Tbk
23	ARII	Atlas Resources Tbk.
24	ARNA	Arwana Citramulia Tbk.
25	ARTA	Arthavest Tbk
26	ARTI	Ratu Prabu Energi Tbk
27	ARTO	Bank Jago Tbk.
28	ASBI	Asuransi Bintang Tbk.
29	ASDM	Asuransi Dayin Mitra Tbk.
30	ASGR	Astra Graphia Tbk.
31	ASII	Astra International Tbk.
32	ASJT	Asuransi Jasa Tania Tbk.
33	ASMI	Asuransi Maximus Graha Persada
34	BAJA	Saranacentral Bajatama Tbk.
35	BALI	Bali Towerindo Sentra Tbk.
36	BAPA	Bekasi Asri Pemula Tbk.
37	BATA	Sepatu Bata Tbk.
38	BAYU	Bayu Buana Tbk
39	BBCA	Bank Central Asia Tbk.
40	BBHI	Allo Bank Indonesia Tbk.
41	BBKP	Bank KB Bukopin Tbk.
42	BBLD	Buana Finance Tbk.
43	BBMD	Bank Mestika Dharma Tbk.
44	BBNI	Bank Negara Indonesia (Persero
45	BBRI	Bank Rakyat Indonesia (Persero
46	BBRM	Pelayaran Nasional Bina Buana
47	BBTN	Bank Tabungan Negara (Persero)
48	BBYB	Bank Neo Commerce Tbk.
49	BCAP	MNC Kapital Indonesia Tbk.
50	BCIC	Bank JTrust Indonesia Tbk.
51	BCIP	Bumi Citra Permai Tbk.
52	BDMN	Bank Danamon Indonesia Tbk.
53	BEKS	Bank Pembangunan Daerah Banten
54	BEST	Bekasi Fajar Industrial Estate
55	BFIN	BFI Finance Indonesia Tbk.
56	BGTG	Bank Ganesha Tbk.
57	BHIT	MNC Asia Holding Tbk.
58	BIKA	Binakarya Jaya Abadi Tbk.
59	BIMA	Primarindo Asia Infrastructure
60	BINA	Bank Ina Perdana Tbk.
61	BIPI	Astrindo Nusantara Infrastrukt
62	BIPP	Bhuwanatala Indah Permai Tbk.
63	BIRD	Blue Bird Tbk.
64	BISI	BISI International Tbk.
65	BJBR	Bank Pembangunan Daerah Jawa B
66	BJTM	Bank Pembangunan Daerah Jawa T
67	BKDP	Bukit Darmo Property Tbk
68	BKSL	Sentul City Tbk.
69	BKSW	Bank QNB Indonesia Tbk.
70	BLTA	Berlian Laju Tanker Tbk
71	BLTZ	Graha Layar Prima Tbk.
72	BMAS	Bank Maspion Indonesia Tbk.
73	BMRI	Bank Mandiri (Persero) Tbk.
74	BMSR	Bintang Mitra Semestaraya Tbk
75	BMTR	Global Mediacom Tbk.
76	BNBA	Bank Bumi Arta Tbk.
77	BNBR	Bakrie & Brothers Tbk
78	BNGA	Bank CIMB Niaga Tbk.
79	BNII	Bank Maybank Indonesia Tbk.
80	BNLI	Bank Permata Tbk.
81	BOLT	Garuda Metalindo Tbk.
82	BPFI	Woori Finance Indonesia Tbk.
83	BPII	Batavia Prosperindo Internasio
84	BRAM	Indo Kordsa Tbk.
85	AALI	Astra Agro Lestari Tbk.
86	ABBA	Mahaka Media Tbk.
87	ABDA	Asuransi Bina Dana Arta Tbk.
88	ABMM	ABM Investama Tbk.
89	ACES	Ace Hardware Indonesia Tbk.
90	ACST	Acset Indonusa Tbk.
91	ADES	Akasha Wira International Tbk.
92	ADHI	Adhi Karya (Persero) Tbk.
93	ADMF	Adira Dinamika Multi Finance T
94	ADMG	Polychem Indonesia Tbk
95	ADRO	Adaro Energy Indonesia Tbk.
96	AGII	Aneka Gas Industri Tbk.
97	AGRO	Bank Raya Indonesia Tbk.
98	AGRS	Bank IBK Indonesia Tbk.
99	AHAP	Asuransi Harta Aman Pratama Tb
100	BRMS	Bumi Resources Minerals Tbk.
101	BRNA	Berlina Tbk.
102	BRPT	Barito Pacific Tbk.
103	BSDE	Bumi Serpong Damai Tbk.
104	BSIM	Bank Sinarmas Tbk.
105	BUKK	Bukaka Teknik Utama Tbk.
106	BULL	Buana Lintas Lautan Tbk.
107	BUMI	Bumi Resources Tbk.
108	BUVA	Bukit Uluwatu Villa Tbk.
109	BVIC	Bank Victoria International Tb
110	BWPT	Eagle High Plantations Tbk.
111	BYAN	Bayan Resources Tbk.
112	CANI	Capitol Nusantara Indonesia Tb
113	CASS	Cardig Aero Services Tbk.
114	CEKA	Wilmar Cahaya Indonesia Tbk.
115	CENT	Centratama Telekomunikasi Indo
116	CFIN	Clipan Finance Indonesia Tbk.
117	CINT	Chitose Internasional Tbk.
118	CITA	Cita Mineral Investindo Tbk.
119	CLPI	Colorpak Indonesia Tbk.
120	CMNP	Citra Marga Nusaphala Persada
121	CMPP	AirAsia Indonesia Tbk.
122	CNKO	Exploitasi Energi Indonesia Tb
123	CNTX	Century Textile Industry Tbk.
124	COWL	Cowell Development Tbk.
125	CPIN	Charoen Pokphand Indonesia Tbk
126	CPRO	Central Proteina Prima Tbk.
127	CSAP	Catur Sentosa Adiprana Tbk.
128	CTBN	Citra Tubindo Tbk.
129	CTRA	Ciputra Development Tbk.
130	CTTH	Citatah Tbk.
131	DART	Duta Anggada Realty Tbk.
132	DEFI	Danasupra Erapacific Tbk.
133	DEWA	Darma Henwa Tbk
134	DGIK	Nusa Konstruksi Enjiniring Tbk
135	DILD	Intiland Development Tbk.
136	DKFT	Central Omega Resources Tbk.
137	DLTA	Delta Djakarta Tbk.
138	DMAS	Puradelta Lestari Tbk.
139	DNAR	Bank Oke Indonesia Tbk.
140	DNET	Indoritel Makmur Internasional
141	DOID	Delta Dunia Makmur Tbk.
142	DPNS	Duta Pertiwi Nusantara Tbk.
143	DSFI	Dharma Samudera Fishing Indust
144	DSNG	Dharma Satya Nusantara Tbk.
145	DSSA	Dian Swastatika Sentosa Tbk
146	DUTI	Duta Pertiwi Tbk
147	DVLA	Darya-Varia Laboratoria Tbk.
148	DYAN	Dyandra Media International Tb
149	ECII	Electronic City Indonesia Tbk.
150	EKAD	Ekadharma International Tbk.
151	ELSA	Elnusa Tbk.
152	ELTY	Bakrieland Development Tbk.
153	EMDE	Megapolitan Developments Tbk.
154	EMTK	Elang Mahkota Teknologi Tbk.
155	ENRG	Energi Mega Persada Tbk.
156	EPMT	Enseval Putera Megatrading Tbk
157	ERAA	Erajaya Swasembada Tbk.
158	ERTX	Eratex Djaja Tbk.
159	ESSA	Surya Esa Perkasa Tbk.
160	ESTI	Ever Shine Tex Tbk.
161	ETWA	Eterindo Wahanatama Tbk
162	EXCL	XL Axiata Tbk.
163	FAST	Fast Food Indonesia Tbk.
164	FASW	Fajar Surya Wisesa Tbk.
165	FISH	FKS Multi Agro Tbk.
166	FMII	Fortune Mate Indonesia Tbk
167	FORU	Fortune Indonesia Tbk
168	FPNI	Lotte Chemical Titan Tbk.
169	FREN	Smartfren Telecom Tbk.
170	GAMA	Aksara Global Development Tbk.
171	GDST	Gunawan Dianjaya Steel Tbk.
172	GDYR	Goodyear Indonesia Tbk.
173	GEMA	Gema Grahasarana Tbk.
174	GEMS	Golden Energy Mines Tbk.
175	GGRM	Gudang Garam Tbk.
176	GIAA	Garuda Indonesia (Persero) Tbk
177	GJTL	Gajah Tunggal Tbk.
178	GLOB	Globe Kita Terang Tbk.
179	GMTD	Gowa Makassar Tourism Developm
180	GOLD	Visi Telekomunikasi Infrastruk
181	GOLL	Golden Plantation Tbk.
182	GPRA	Perdana Gapuraprima Tbk.
183	GSMF	Equity Development Investment
184	GTBO	Garda Tujuh Buana Tbk
185	GWSA	Greenwood Sejahtera Tbk.
186	GZCO	Gozco Plantations Tbk.
187	HADE	Himalaya Energi Perkasa Tbk.
188	HDFA	Radana Bhaskara Finance Tbk.
189	HDTX	Panasia Indo Resources Tbk.
190	HERO	Hero Supermarket Tbk.
191	HEXA	Hexindo Adiperkasa Tbk.
192	HITS	Humpuss Intermoda Transportasi
193	HMSP	H.M. Sampoerna Tbk.
194	HOME	Hotel Mandarine Regency Tbk.
195	HOTL	Saraswati Griya Lestari Tbk.
196	HRUM	Harum Energy Tbk.
197	IATA	MNC Energy Investments Tbk.
198	IBFN	Intan Baru Prana Tbk.
199	IBST	Inti Bangun Sejahtera Tbk.
200	ICBP	Indofood CBP Sukses Makmur Tbk
201	ICON	Island Concepts Indonesia Tbk.
202	IGAR	Champion Pacific Indonesia Tbk
203	IIKP	Inti Agri Resources Tbk
204	IKAI	Intikeramik Alamasri Industri
205	IKBI	Sumi Indo Kabel Tbk.
206	IMAS	Indomobil Sukses Internasional
207	INDS	Indospring Tbk.
208	INDX	Tanah Laut Tbk
209	INDY	Indika Energy Tbk.
210	INKP	Indah Kiat Pulp & Paper Tbk.
211	INPC	Bank Artha Graha Internasional
212	INPP	Indonesian Paradise Property T
213	INRU	Toba Pulp Lestari Tbk.
214	INTA	Intraco Penta Tbk.
215	INTD	Inter Delta Tbk
216	INTP	Indocement Tunggal Prakarsa Tb
217	IPOL	Indopoly Swakarsa Industry Tbk
218	ISAT	Indosat Tbk.
219	ISSP	Steel Pipe Industry of Indones
220	ITMA	Sumber Energi Andalan Tbk.
221	ITMG	Indo Tambangraya Megah Tbk.
222	JAWA	Jaya Agra Wattie Tbk.
223	JECC	Jembo Cable Company Tbk.
224	JIHD	Jakarta International Hotels &
225	JKON	Jaya Konstruksi Manggala Prata
226	JKSW	Jakarta Kyoei Steel Works Tbk.
227	JPFA	Japfa Comfeed Indonesia Tbk.
228	JRPT	Jaya Real Property Tbk.
229	KDSI	Kedawung Setia Industrial Tbk.
230	KIAS	Keramika Indonesia Assosiasi T
231	KICI	Kedaung Indah Can Tbk
232	KIJA	Kawasan Industri Jababeka Tbk.
233	KKGI	Resource Alam Indonesia Tbk.
234	KLBF	Kalbe Farma Tbk.
235	KOBX	Kobexindo Tractors Tbk.
236	KOIN	Kokoh Inti Arebama Tbk
237	KONI	Perdana Bangun Pusaka Tbk
238	KOPI	Mitra Energi Persada Tbk.
239	KPIG	MNC Land Tbk.
240	KRAH	Grand Kartech Tbk.
241	KRAS	Krakatau Steel (Persero) Tbk.
242	KREN	Kresna Graha Investama Tbk.
243	LAPD	Leyand International Tbk.
244	LCGP	Eureka Prima Jakarta Tbk.
245	LEAD	Logindo Samudramakmur Tbk.
246	LINK	Link Net Tbk.
247	LION	Lion Metal Works Tbk.
248	LMAS	Limas Indonesia Makmur Tbk
249	LMPI	Langgeng Makmur Industri Tbk.
250	LMSH	Lionmesh Prima Tbk.
251	LPCK	Lippo Cikarang Tbk
252	LPGI	Lippo General Insurance Tbk.
253	LPIN	Multi Prima Sejahtera Tbk
254	LPKR	Lippo Karawaci Tbk.
255	LPLI	Star Pacific Tbk
256	LPPF	Matahari Department Store Tbk.
257	LPPS	Lenox Pasifik Investama Tbk.
258	LRNA	Eka Sari Lorena Transport Tbk.
259	LSIP	PP London Sumatra Indonesia Tb
260	LTLS	Lautan Luas Tbk.
261	MAGP	Multi Agro Gemilang Plantation
262	MAIN	Malindo Feedmill Tbk.
263	MAMI	Mas Murni Indonesia Tbk
264	MAPI	Mitra Adiperkasa Tbk.
265	MASA	Multistrada Arah Sarana Tbk.
266	MAYA	Bank Mayapada Internasional Tb
267	MBAP	Mitrabara Adiperdana Tbk.
268	MBSS	Mitrabahtera Segara Sejati Tbk
269	MBTO	Martina Berto Tbk.
270	MCOR	Bank China Construction Bank I
271	MDIA	Intermedia Capital Tbk.
272	MDKA	Merdeka Copper Gold Tbk.
273	MDLN	Modernland Realty Tbk.
274	MDRN	Modern Internasional Tbk.
275	MEDC	Medco Energi Internasional Tbk
276	MEGA	Bank Mega Tbk.
277	MERK	Merck Tbk.
278	META	Nusantara Infrastructure Tbk.
279	MFIN	Mandala Multifinance Tbk.
280	MFMI	Multifiling Mitra Indonesia Tb
281	MGNA	Magna Investama Mandiri Tbk.
282	MICE	Multi Indocitra Tbk.
283	MIDI	Midi Utama Indonesia Tbk.
284	MIKA	Mitra Keluarga Karyasehat Tbk.
285	MIRA	Mitra International Resources
286	MITI	Mitra Investindo Tbk.
287	MKPI	Metropolitan Kentjana Tbk.
288	MLBI	Multi Bintang Indonesia Tbk.
289	MLIA	Mulia Industrindo Tbk
290	MLPL	Multipolar Tbk.
291	MLPT	Multipolar Technology Tbk.
292	MMLP	Mega Manunggal Property Tbk.
293	MNCN	Media Nusantara Citra Tbk.
294	MPMX	Mitra Pinasthika Mustika Tbk.
295	MPPA	Matahari Putra Prima Tbk.
296	MRAT	Mustika Ratu Tbk.
297	MREI	Maskapai Reasuransi Indonesia
298	MSKY	MNC Sky Vision Tbk.
299	MTDL	Metrodata Electronics Tbk.
300	MTFN	Capitalinc Investment Tbk.
301	MTLA	Metropolitan Land Tbk.
302	MTSM	Metro Realty Tbk.
303	MYOH	Samindo Resources Tbk.
304	MYOR	Mayora Indah Tbk.
305	MYRX	Hanson International Tbk.
306	MYTX	Asia Pacific Investama Tbk.
307	NELY	Pelayaran Nelly Dwi Putri Tbk.
308	NIKL	Pelat Timah Nusantara Tbk.
309	NIPS	Nipress Tbk.
310	NIRO	City Retail Developments Tbk.
311	NISP	Bank OCBC NISP Tbk.
312	NOBU	Bank Nationalnobu Tbk.
313	NRCA	Nusa Raya Cipta Tbk.
314	OCAP	Onix Capital Tbk.
315	OKAS	Ancora Indonesia Resources Tbk
316	OMRE	Indonesia Prima Property Tbk
317	PADI	Minna Padi Investama Sekuritas
318	PALM	Provident Investasi Bersama Tb
319	PANR	Panorama Sentrawisata Tbk.
320	PANS	Panin Sekuritas Tbk.
321	PBRX	Pan Brothers Tbk.
322	PDES	Destinasi Tirta Nusantara Tbk
323	PEGE	Panca Global Kapital Tbk.
324	PGAS	Perusahaan Gas Negara Tbk.
325	PGLI	Pembangunan Graha Lestari Inda
326	PICO	Pelangi Indah Canindo Tbk
327	PJAA	Pembangunan Jaya Ancol Tbk.
328	PKPK	Perdana Karya Perkasa Tbk
329	PLAS	Polaris Investama Tbk
330	PLIN	Plaza Indonesia Realty Tbk.
331	PNBN	Bank Pan Indonesia Tbk
332	PNBS	Bank Panin Dubai Syariah Tbk.
333	PNIN	Paninvest Tbk.
334	PNLF	Panin Financial Tbk.
335	PNSE	Pudjiadi & Sons Tbk.
336	POLY	Asia Pacific Fibers Tbk
337	POOL	Pool Advista Indonesia Tbk.
338	PPRO	PP Properti Tbk.
339	PRAS	Prima Alloy Steel Universal Tb
340	PSAB	J Resources Asia Pasifik Tbk.
341	PSDN	Prasidha Aneka Niaga Tbk
342	PSKT	Red Planet Indonesia Tbk.
343	PTBA	Bukit Asam Tbk.
344	PTIS	Indo Straits Tbk.
345	PTPP	PP (Persero) Tbk.
346	PTRO	Petrosea Tbk.
347	PTSN	Sat Nusapersada Tbk
348	PTSP	Pioneerindo Gourmet Internatio
349	PUDP	Pudjiadi Prestige Tbk.
350	PWON	Pakuwon Jati Tbk.
351	PYFA	Pyridam Farma Tbk
352	RAJA	Rukun Raharja Tbk.
353	RALS	Ramayana Lestari Sentosa Tbk.
354	RANC	Supra Boga Lestari Tbk.
355	RBMS	Ristia Bintang Mahkotasejati T
356	RDTX	Roda Vivatex Tbk
357	RELI	Reliance Sekuritas Indonesia T
358	RICY	Ricky Putra Globalindo Tbk
359	RIGS	Rig Tenders Indonesia Tbk.
360	RIMO	Rimo International Lestari Tbk
361	RMBA	Bentoel Internasional Investam
362	RODA	Pikko Land Development Tbk.
363	ROTI	Nippon Indosari Corpindo Tbk.
364	RUIS	Radiant Utama Interinsco Tbk.
365	SAFE	Steady Safe Tbk
366	SAME	Sarana Meditama Metropolitan T
367	SCCO	Supreme Cable Manufacturing &
368	SCMA	Surya Citra Media Tbk.
369	SCPI	Organon Pharma Indonesia Tbk.
370	SDMU	Sidomulyo Selaras Tbk.
371	SDPC	Millennium Pharmacon Internati
372	SDRA	Bank Woori Saudara Indonesia 1
373	SGRO	Sampoerna Agro Tbk.
374	SHID	Hotel Sahid Jaya International
375	SIDO	Industri Jamu dan Farmasi Sido
376	SILO	Siloam International Hospitals
377	SIMA	Siwani Makmur Tbk
378	SIMP	Salim Ivomas Pratama Tbk.
379	SIPD	Sreeya Sewu Indonesia Tbk.
380	SKBM	Sekar Bumi Tbk.
381	SKLT	Sekar Laut Tbk.
382	SKYB	Northcliff Citranusa Indonesia
383	SMAR	Smart Tbk.
384	SMBR	Semen Baturaja (Persero) Tbk.
385	SMCB	Solusi Bangun Indonesia Tbk.
386	SMDM	Suryamas Dutamakmur Tbk.
387	SMDR	Samudera Indonesia Tbk.
388	SMGR	Semen Indonesia (Persero) Tbk.
389	SMMA	Sinarmas Multiartha Tbk.
390	SMMT	Golden Eagle Energy Tbk.
391	SMRA	Summarecon Agung Tbk.
392	SMRU	SMR Utama Tbk.
393	SMSM	Selamat Sempurna Tbk.
394	SOCI	Soechi Lines Tbk.
395	SONA	Sona Topas Tourism Industry Tb
396	SPMA	Suparma Tbk.
397	SQMI	Wilton Makmur Indonesia Tbk.
398	SRAJ	Sejahteraraya Anugrahjaya Tbk.
399	SRIL	Sri Rejeki Isman Tbk.
400	SRSN	Indo Acidatama Tbk
401	SRTG	Saratoga Investama Sedaya Tbk.
402	SSIA	Surya Semesta Internusa Tbk.
403	SSMS	Sawit Sumbermas Sarana Tbk.
404	SSTM	Sunson Textile Manufacture Tbk
405	STAR	Buana Artha Anugerah Tbk.
406	STTP	Siantar Top Tbk.
407	SUGI	Sugih Energy Tbk.
408	SULI	SLJ Global Tbk.
409	SUPR	Solusi Tunas Pratama Tbk.
410	TALF	Tunas Alfin Tbk.
411	TARA	Agung Semesta Sejahtera Tbk.
412	TAXI	Express Transindo Utama Tbk.
413	TBIG	Tower Bersama Infrastructure T
414	TBLA	Tunas Baru Lampung Tbk.
415	TBMS	Tembaga Mulia Semanan Tbk.
416	TKIM	Pabrik Kertas Tjiwi Kimia Tbk.
417	TLKM	Telkom Indonesia (Persero) Tbk
418	TMAS	Temas Tbk.
419	TMPO	Tempo Intimedia Tbk.
420	TOBA	TBS Energi Utama Tbk.
421	TOTL	Total Bangun Persada Tbk.
422	TOTO	Surya Toto Indonesia Tbk.
423	TOWR	Sarana Menara Nusantara Tbk.
424	TPIA	Chandra Asri Petrochemical Tbk
425	TPMA	Trans Power Marine Tbk.
426	TRAM	Trada Alam Minera Tbk.
427	TRIL	Triwira Insanlestari Tbk.
428	TRIM	Trimegah Sekuritas Indonesia T
429	TRIO	Trikomsel Oke Tbk.
430	TRIS	Trisula International Tbk.
431	TRST	Trias Sentosa Tbk.
432	TRUS	Trust Finance Indonesia Tbk
433	TSPC	Tempo Scan Pacific Tbk.
434	TURI	Tunas Ridean Tbk.
435	ULTJ	Ultra Jaya Milk Industry & Tra
436	UNIC	Unggul Indah Cahaya Tbk.
437	UNIT	Nusantara Inti Corpora Tbk
438	UNSP	Bakrie Sumatera Plantations Tb
439	UNTR	United Tractors Tbk.
440	UNVR	Unilever Indonesia Tbk.
441	VICO	Victoria Investama Tbk.
442	VINS	Victoria Insurance Tbk.
443	VIVA	Visi Media Asia Tbk.
444	VOKS	Voksel Electric Tbk.
445	VRNA	Verena Multi Finance Tbk.
446	WAPO	Wahana Pronatural Tbk.
447	WEHA	WEHA Transportasi Indonesia Tb
448	WICO	Wicaksana Overseas Internation
449	WIIM	Wismilak Inti Makmur Tbk.
450	SHIP	Sillo Maritime Perdana Tbk.
451	CASA	Capital Financial Indonesia Tb
452	DAYA	Duta Intidaya Tbk.
453	DPUM	Dua Putra Utama Makmur Tbk.
454	IDPR	Indonesia Pondasi Raya Tbk.
455	JGLE	Graha Andrasentra Propertindo
456	INCF	Indo Komoditi Korpora Tbk.
457	WSBP	Waskita Beton Precast Tbk.
458	PBSA	Paramita Bangun Sarana Tbk.
459	PRDA	Prodia Widyahusada Tbk.
460	BOGA	Bintang Oto Global Tbk.
461	BRIS	Bank Syariah Indonesia Tbk.
462	CSIS	Cahayasakti Investindo Sukses
463	TGRA	Terregra Asia Energy Tbk.
464	FIRE	Alfa Energi Investama Tbk.
465	TOPS	Totalindo Eka Persada Tbk.
466	KMTR	Kirana Megatara Tbk.
467	ARMY	Armidian Karyatama Tbk.
468	MAPB	MAP Boga Adiperkasa Tbk.
469	WOOD	Integra Indocabinet Tbk.
470	HRTA	Hartadinata Abadi Tbk.
471	MABA	Marga Abhinaya Abadi Tbk.
472	HOKI	Buyung Poetra Sembada Tbk.
473	MPOW	Megapower Makmur Tbk.
474	MARK	Mark Dynamics Indonesia Tbk.
475	NASA	Andalan Perkasa Abadi Tbk.
476	MDKI	Emdeki Utama Tbk.
477	BELL	Trisula Textile Industries Tbk
478	KIOS	Kioson Komersial Indonesia Tbk
479	GMFI	Garuda Maintenance Facility Ae
480	MTWI	Malacca Trust Wuwungan Insuran
481	ZINC	Kapuas Prima Coal Tbk.
482	MCAS	M Cash Integrasi Tbk.
483	PPRE	PP Presisi Tbk.
484	WEGE	Wijaya Karya Bangunan Gedung T
485	PSSI	Pelita Samudera Shipping Tbk.
486	MORA	Mora Telematika Indonesia Tbk.
487	DWGL	Dwi Guna Laksana Tbk.
488	PBID	Panca Budi Idaman Tbk.
489	JSKY	Sky Energy Indonesia Tbk.
490	INPS	Indah Prakasa Sentosa Tbk.
491	GHON	Gihon Telekomunikasi Indonesia
492	TDPM	Tridomain Performance Material
493	DFAM	Dafam Property Indonesia Tbk.
494	NICK	Charnic Capital Tbk.
495	BTPS	Bank BTPN Syariah Tbk.
496	SPTO	Surya Pertiwi Tbk.
497	PRIM	Royal Prima Tbk.
498	HEAL	Medikaloka Hermina Tbk.
499	TRUK	Guna Timur Raya Tbk.
500	PZZA	Sarimelati Kencana Tbk.
501	TUGU	Asuransi Tugu Pratama Indonesi
502	MSIN	MNC Digital Entertainment Tbk.
503	SWAT	Sriwahana Adityakarta Tbk.
504	KPAL	Steadfast Marine Tbk.
505	TNCA	Trimuda Nuansa Citra Tbk.
506	MAPA	Map Aktif Adiperkasa Tbk.
507	TCPI	Transcoal Pacific Tbk.
508	IPCC	Indonesia Kendaraan Terminal T
509	RISE	Jaya Sukses Makmur Sentosa Tbk
510	BPTR	Batavia Prosperindo Trans Tbk.
511	POLL	Pollux Properties Indonesia Tb
512	NFCX	NFC Indonesia Tbk.
513	MGRO	Mahkota Group Tbk.
514	NUSA	Sinergi Megah Internusa Tbk.
515	FILM	MD Pictures Tbk.
516	ANDI	Andira Agro Tbk.
517	LAND	Trimitra Propertindo Tbk.
518	MOLI	Madusari Murni Indah Tbk.
519	PANI	Pratama Abadi Nusa Industri Tb
520	DIGI	Arkadia Digital Media Tbk.
521	CITY	Natura City Developments Tbk.
522	SAPX	Satria Antaran Prima Tbk.
523	KPAS	Cottonindo Ariesta Tbk.
524	SURE	Super Energy Tbk.
525	HKMU	HK Metals Utama Tbk.
526	MPRO	Maha Properti Indonesia Tbk.
527	DUCK	Jaya Bersama Indo Tbk.
528	GOOD	Garudafood Putra Putri Jaya Tb
529	SKRN	Superkrane Mitra Utama Tbk.
530	YELO	Yelooo Integra Datanet Tbk.
531	CAKK	Cahayaputra Asa Keramik Tbk.
532	SATU	Kota Satu Properti Tbk.
533	SOSS	Shield On Service Tbk.
534	DEAL	Dewata Freightinternational Tb
535	POLA	Pool Advista Finance Tbk.
536	DIVA	Distribusi Voucher Nusantara T
537	LUCK	Sentral Mitra Informatika Tbk.
538	URBN	Urban Jakarta Propertindo Tbk.
539	SOTS	Satria Mega Kencana Tbk.
540	ZONE	Mega Perintis Tbk.
541	PEHA	Phapros Tbk.
542	FOOD	Sentra Food Indonesia Tbk.
543	BEEF	Estika Tata Tiara Tbk.
544	POLI	Pollux Hotels Group Tbk.
545	CLAY	Citra Putra Realty Tbk.
546	NATO	Surya Permata Andalan Tbk.
547	JAYA	Armada Berjaya Trans Tbk.
548	COCO	Wahana Interfood Nusantara Tbk
549	MTPS	Meta Epsi Tbk.
550	CPRI	Capri Nusa Satu Properti Tbk.
551	HRME	Menteng Heritage Realty Tbk.
552	POSA	Bliss Properti Indonesia Tbk.
553	JAST	Jasnita Telekomindo Tbk.
554	FITT	Hotel Fitra International Tbk.
555	BOLA	Bali Bintang Sejahtera Tbk.
556	CCSI	Communication Cable Systems In
557	SFAN	Surya Fajar Capital Tbk.
558	POLU	Golden Flower Tbk.
559	KJEN	Krida Jaringan Nusantara Tbk.
560	KAYU	Darmi Bersaudara Tbk.
561	ITIC	Indonesian Tobacco Tbk.
562	PAMG	Bima Sakti Pertiwi Tbk.
563	IPTV	MNC Vision Networks Tbk.
564	BLUE	Berkah Prima Perkasa Tbk.
565	ENVY	Envy Technologies Indonesia Tb
566	EAST	Eastparc Hotel Tbk.
567	LIFE	Asuransi Jiwa Sinarmas MSIG Tb
568	FUJI	Fuji Finance Indonesia Tbk.
569	KOTA	DMS Propertindo Tbk.
570	INOV	Inocycle Technology Group Tbk.
571	ARKA	Arkha Jayanti Persada Tbk.
572	SMKL	Satyamitra Kemas Lestari Tbk.
573	HDIT	Hensel Davest Indonesia Tbk.
574	KEEN	Kencana Energi Lestari Tbk.
575	BAPI	Bhakti Agung Propertindo Tbk.
576	TFAS	Telefast Indonesia Tbk.
577	GGRP	Gunung Raja Paksi Tbk.
578	OPMS	Optima Prima Metal Sinergi Tbk
579	NZIA	Nusantara Almazia Tbk.
580	SLIS	Gaya Abadi Sempurna Tbk.
581	PURE	Trinitan Metals and Minerals T
582	IRRA	Itama Ranoraya Tbk.
583	DMMX	Digital Mediatama Maxima Tbk.
584	SINI	Singaraja Putra Tbk.
585	WOWS	Ginting Jaya Energi Tbk.
586	ESIP	Sinergi Inti Plastindo Tbk.
587	TEBE	Dana Brata Luhur Tbk.
588	KEJU	Mulia Boga Raya Tbk.
589	PSGO	Palma Serasih Tbk.
590	AGAR	Asia Sejahtera Mina Tbk.
591	IFSH	Ifishdeco Tbk.
592	REAL	Repower Asia Indonesia Tbk.
593	IFII	Indonesia Fibreboard Industry
594	PMJS	Putra Mandiri Jembar Tbk.
595	UCID	Uni-Charm Indonesia Tbk.
596	GLVA	Galva Technologies Tbk.
597	PGJO	Tourindo Guide Indonesia Tbk.
598	AMAR	Bank Amar Indonesia Tbk.
599	CSRA	Cisadane Sawit Raya Tbk.
600	INDO	Royalindo Investa Wijaya Tbk.
601	AMOR	Ashmore Asset Management Indon
602	TRIN	Perintis Triniti Properti Tbk.
603	DMND	Diamond Food Indonesia Tbk.
604	PURA	Putra Rajawali Kencana Tbk.
605	PTPW	Pratama Widya Tbk.
606	TAMA	Lancartama Sejati Tbk.
607	IKAN	Era Mandiri Cemerlang Tbk.
608	AYLS	Agro Yasa Lestari Tbk.
609	DADA	Diamond Citra Propertindo Tbk.
610	ASPI	Andalan Sakti Primaindo Tbk.
611	ESTA	Esta Multi Usaha Tbk.
612	BESS	Batulicin Nusantara Maritim Tb
613	AMAN	Makmur Berkah Amanda Tbk.
614	CARE	Metro Healthcare Indonesia Tbk
615	SAMF	Saraswanti Anugerah Makmur Tbk
616	SBAT	Sejahtera Bintang Abadi Textil
617	KBAG	Karya Bersama Anugerah Tbk.
618	CBMF	Cahaya Bintang Medan Tbk.
619	RONY	Aesler Grup Internasional Tbk.
620	CSMI	Cipta Selera Murni Tbk.
621	BBSS	Bumi Benowo Sukses Sejahtera T
622	BHAT	Bhakti Multi Artha Tbk.
623	CASH	Cashlez Worldwide Indonesia Tb
624	TECH	Indosterling Technomedia Tbk.
625	EPAC	Megalestari Epack Sentosaraya
626	UANG	Pakuan Tbk.
627	PGUN	Pradiksi Gunatama Tbk.
628	SOFA	Boston Furniture Industries Tb
629	PPGL	Prima Globalindo Logistik Tbk.
630	TOYS	Sunindo Adipersada Tbk.
631	SGER	Sumber Global Energy Tbk.
632	TRJA	Transkon Jaya Tbk.
633	PNGO	Pinago Utama Tbk.
634	SCNP	Selaras Citra Nusantara Perkas
635	BBSI	Krom Bank Indonesia Tbk.
636	KMDS	Kurniamitra Duta Sentosa Tbk.
637	PURI	Puri Global Sukses Tbk.
638	SOHO	Soho Global Health Tbk.
639	HOMI	Grand House Mulia Tbk.
640	ROCK	Rockfields Properti Indonesia
641	ENZO	Morenzo Abadi Perkasa Tbk.
642	PLAN	Planet Properindo Jaya Tbk.
643	PTDU	Djasa Ubersakti Tbk.
644	ATAP	Trimitra Prawara Goldland Tbk.
645	VICI	Victoria Care Indonesia Tbk.
646	PMMP	Panca Mitra Multiperdana Tbk.
647	WIFI	Solusi Sinergi Digital Tbk.
648	FAPA	FAP Agri Tbk.
649	DCII	DCI Indonesia Tbk.
650	KETR	Ketrosden Triasmitra Tbk.
651	DGNS	Diagnos Laboratorium Utama Tbk
652	UFOE	Damai Sejahtera Abadi Tbk.
653	BANK	Bank Aladin Syariah Tbk.
654	WMUU	Widodo Makmur Unggas Tbk.
655	EDGE	Indointernet Tbk.
656	UNIQ	Ulima Nitra Tbk.
657	BEBS	Berkah Beton Sadaya Tbk.
658	SNLK	Sunter Lakeside Hotel Tbk.
659	ZYRX	Zyrexindo Mandiri Buana Tbk.
660	LFLO	Imago Mulia Persada Tbk.
661	FIMP	Fimperkasa Utama Tbk.
662	TAPG	Triputra Agro Persada Tbk.
663	NPGF	Nusa Palapa Gemilang Tbk.
664	LUCY	Lima Dua Lima Tiga Tbk.
665	ADCP	Adhi Commuter Properti Tbk.
666	HOPE	Harapan Duta Pertiwi Tbk.
667	MGLV	Panca Anugrah Wisesa Tbk.
668	TRUE	Triniti Dinamik Tbk.
669	LABA	Ladangbaja Murni Tbk.
670	ARCI	Archi Indonesia Tbk.
671	IPAC	Era Graharealty Tbk.
672	MASB	Bank Multiarta Sentosa Tbk.
673	BMHS	Bundamedik Tbk.
674	FLMC	Falmaco Nonwoven Industri Tbk.
675	NICL	PAM Mineral Tbk.
676	UVCR	Trimegah Karya Pratama Tbk.
677	BUKA	Bukalapak.com Tbk.
678	HAIS	Hasnur Internasional Shipping
679	OILS	Indo Oil Perkasa Tbk.
680	GPSO	Geoprima Solusi Tbk.
681	TCID	Mandom Indonesia Tbk.
682	TELE	Omni Inovasi Indonesia Tbk.
683	TFCO	Tifico Fiber Indonesia Tbk.
684	TGKA	Tigaraksa Satria Tbk.
685	TIFA	KDB Tifa Finance Tbk.
686	TINS	Timah Tbk.
687	TIRA	Tira Austenite Tbk
688	TIRT	Tirta Mahakam Resources Tbk
689	MKTR	Menthobi Karyatama Raya Tbk.
690	OMED	Jayamas Medica Industri Tbk.
691	BSBK	Wulandari Bangun Laksana Tbk.
692	PDPP	Primadaya Plastisindo Tbk.
693	KDTN	Puri Sentul Permai Tbk.
694	ZATA	Bersama Zatta Jaya Tbk.
695	BSSR	Baramulti Suksessarana Tbk.
696	BSWD	Bank Of India Indonesia Tbk.
697	BTEK	Bumi Teknokultura Unggul Tbk
698	BTEL	Bakrie Telecom Tbk.
699	BTON	Betonjaya Manunggal Tbk.
700	BTPN	Bank BTPN Tbk.
701	BUDI	Budi Starch & Sweetener Tbk.
702	MCOL	Prima Andalan Mandiri Tbk.
703	RSGK	Kedoya Adyaraya Tbk.
704	RUNS	Global Sukses Solusi Tbk.
705	SBMA	Surya Biru Murni Acetylene Tbk
706	CMNT	Cemindo Gemilang Tbk.
707	GTSI	GTS Internasional Tbk.
708	IDEA	Idea Indonesia Akademi Tbk.
709	KUAS	Ace Oldfields Tbk.
710	BOBA	Formosa Ingredient Factory Tbk
711	MTEL	Dayamitra Telekomunikasi Tbk.
712	DEPO	Caturkarda Depo Bangunan Tbk.
713	BINO	Perma Plasindo Tbk.
714	CMRY	Cisarua Mountain Dairy Tbk.
715	PORT	Nusantara Pelabuhan Handal Tbk
716	CARS	Industri dan Perdagangan Bintr
717	MINA	Sanurhasta Mitra Tbk.
718	FORZ	Forza Land Indonesia Tbk.
719	CLEO	Sariguna Primatirta Tbk.
720	TAMU	Pelayaran Tamarin Samudra Tbk.
721	WIKA	Wijaya Karya (Persero) Tbk.
722	WINS	Wintermar Offshore Marine Tbk.
723	WOMF	Wahana Ottomitra Multiartha Tb
724	WSKT	Waskita Karya (Persero) Tbk.
725	WTON	Wijaya Karya Beton Tbk.
726	YPAS	Yanaprima Hastapersada Tbk
727	YULE	Yulie Sekuritas Indonesia Tbk.
728	ZBRA	Dosni Roha Indonesia Tbk.
729	IMJS	Indomobil Multi Jasa Tbk.
730	IMPC	Impack Pratama Industri Tbk.
731	INAF	Indofarma Tbk.
732	INAI	Indal Aluminium Industry Tbk.
733	INCI	Intanwijaya Internasional Tbk
734	INCO	Vale Indonesia Tbk.
735	INDF	Indofood Sukses Makmur Tbk.
736	INDR	Indo-Rama Synthetics Tbk.
737	WGSH	Wira Global Solusi Tbk.
738	TAYS	Jaya Swarasa Agung Tbk.
739	WMPP	Widodo Makmur Perkasa Tbk.
740	RMKE	RMK Energy Tbk.
741	OBMD	OBM Drilchem Tbk.
742	AVIA	Avia Avian Tbk.
743	IPPE	Indo Pureco Pratama Tbk.
744	NASI	Wahana Inti Makmur Tbk.
745	BSML	Bintang Samudera Mandiri Lines
746	DRMA	Dharma Polimetal Tbk.
747	ADMR	Adaro Minerals Indonesia Tbk.
748	SEMA	Semacom Integrated Tbk.
749	ASLC	Autopedia Sukses Lestari Tbk.
750	JMAS	Asuransi Jiwa Syariah Jasa Mit
751	CAMP	Campina Ice Cream Industry Tbk
752	IPCM	Jasa Armada Indonesia Tbk.
753	PCAR	Prima Cakrawala Abadi Tbk.
754	LCKM	LCK Global Kedaton Tbk.
755	BOSS	Borneo Olah Sarana Sukses Tbk.
756	HELI	Jaya Trishindo Tbk.
757	NETV	Net Visi Media Tbk.
758	BAUT	Mitra Angkasa Sejahtera Tbk.
759	ENAK	Champ Resto Indonesia Tbk.
760	NTBK	Nusatama Berkah Tbk.
761	SMKM	Sumber Mas Konstruksi Tbk.
762	STAA	Sumber Tani Agung Resources Tb
763	NANO	Nanotech Indonesia Global Tbk.
764	BIKE	Sepeda Bersama Indonesia Tbk.
765	JSMR	Jasa Marga (Persero) Tbk.
766	JSPT	Jakarta Setiabudi Internasiona
767	JTPE	Jasuindo Tiga Perkasa Tbk.
768	KAEF	Kimia Farma Tbk.
769	KARW	ICTSI Jasa Prima Tbk.
770	KBLI	KMI Wire & Cable Tbk.
771	KBLM	Kabelindo Murni Tbk.
772	KBLV	First Media Tbk.
773	KBRI	Kertas Basuki Rachmat Indonesi
774	WIRG	WIR ASIA Tbk.
775	SICO	Sigma Energy Compressindo Tbk.
776	GOTO	GoTo Gojek Tokopedia Tbk.
777	TLDN	Teladan Prima Agro Tbk.
778	MTMH	Murni Sadar Tbk.
779	WINR	Winner Nusantara Jaya Tbk.
780	IBOS	Indo Boga Sukses Tbk.
781	OLIV	Oscar Mitra Sukses Sejahtera T
782	ASHA	Cilacap Samudera Fishing Indus
783	SWID	Saraswanti Indoland Development
784	TRGU	Cerestar Indonesia Tbk.
785	ARKO	Arkora Hydro Tbk.
786	ASRI	Alam Sutera Realty Tbk.
787	ASRM	Asuransi Ramayana Tbk.
788	ASSA	Adi Sarana Armada Tbk.
789	ATIC	Anabatic Technologies Tbk.
790	AUTO	Astra Otoparts Tbk.
791	BABP	Bank MNC Internasional Tbk.
792	BACA	Bank Capital Indonesia Tbk.
793	KINO	Kino Indonesia Tbk.
794	MARI	Mahaka Radio Integra Tbk.
795	MKNT	Mitra Komunikasi Nusantara Tbk
796	MTRA	Mitra Pemuda Tbk.
797	OASA	Maharaksa Biru Energi Tbk.
798	POWR	Cikarang Listrindo Tbk.
799	CHEM	Chemstar Indonesia Tbk.
800	DEWI	Dewi Shri Farmindo Tbk.
801	AXIO	Tera Data Indonusa Tbk.
802	KRYA	Bangun Karya Perkasa Jaya Tbk.
803	HATM	Habco Trans Maritima Tbk.
804	RCCC	Utama Radar Cahaya Tbk.
805	GULA	Aman Agrindo Tbk.
806	JARR	Jhonlin Agro Raya Tbk.
807	AMMS	Agung Menjangan Mas Tbk.
808	RAFI	Sari Kreasi Boga Tbk.
809	KKES	Kusuma Kemindo Sentosa Tbk.
810	ELPI	Pelayaran Nasional Ekalya Purn
811	EURO	Estee Gold Feet Tbk.
812	KLIN	Klinko Karya Imaji Tbk.
813	TOOL	Rohartindo Nusantara Luas Tbk.
814	BUAH	Segar Kumala Indonesia Tbk.
815	CRAB	Toba Surimi Industries Tbk.
816	MEDS	Hetzer Medical Indonesia Tbk.
817	COAL	Black Diamond Resources Tbk.
818	PRAY	Famon Awal Bros Sedaya Tbk.
819	CBUT	Citra Borneo Utama Tbk.
820	BELI	Global Digital Niaga Tbk.

As for Sharia Index (ISSI), consist of 530 companies

No.	Code	Emitents Name
1	AALI	Astra Agro Lestari Tbk
2	ACES	Ace Hardware Indonesia Tbk
3	ACRO	Samcro Hyosung Adilestari Tbk
4	ACST	Acset Indonusa Tbk
5	ADCP	Adhi Commuter Properti Tbk
6	ADES	Akasha Wira International Tbk
7	ADHI	Adhi Karya (Persero) Tbk
8	ADMG	Polychem Indonesia Tbk
9	ADMR	Adaro Minerals Indonesia Tbk
10	ADRO	Adaro Energy Indonesia Tbk
11	AEGS	Anugerah Spareparts Sejahtera Tbk
12	AGAR	Asia Sejahtera Mina Tbk
13	AGII	Samator Indo Gas Tbk
14	AIMS	Akbar Indo Makmur Stimec Tbk
15	AISA	FKS Food Sejahtera Tbk
16	AKKU	Anugerah Kagum Karya Utama Tbk
17	AKPI	Argha Karya Prima Industry Tbk
18	AKRA	AKR Corporindo Tbk
19	AKSI	Mineral Sumberdaya Mandiri Tbk
20	ALDO	Alkindo Naratama Tbk
21	ALKA	Alakasa Industrindo Tbk
22	AMAN	Makmur Berkah Amanda Tbk
23	AMFG	Asahimas Flat Glass Tbk
24	AMIN	Ateliers Mecaniques D Indonesie Tbk
25	AMMN	Amman Mineral Internasional Tbk
26	AMMS	Agung Menjangan Mas Tbk.
27	ANDI	Andira Agro Tbk
28	ANJT	Austindo Nusantara Jaya Tbk
29	ANTM	Aneka Tambang Tbk
30	APII	Arita Prima Indonesia Tbk
31	APLI	Asiaplast Industries Tbk
32	APLN	Agung Podomoro Land Tbk
33	ARCI	Archi Indonesia Tbk
34	AREA	Dunia Virtual Online Tbk
35	ARGO	Argo Pantes Tbk
36	ARII	Atlas Resources Tbk
37	ARNA	Arwana Citramulia Tbk
38	ARTA	Arthavest Tbk
39	ASGR	Astra Graphia Tbk
40	ASHA	Cilacap Samudera Fishing Industry Tbk
41	ASII	Astra International Tbk
42	ASLC	Autopedia Sukses Lestari Tbk
43	ASLI	Asri Karya Lestari Tbk
44	ASPI	Andalan Sakti Primaindo Tbk
45	ASRI	Alam Sutera Realty Tbk
46	ATAP	Trimitra Prawara Goldland Tbk
47	ATLA	Atlantis Subsea Indonesia Tbk
48	AUTO	Astra Otoparts Tbk
49	AVIA	Avia Avian Tbk
50	AWAN	Era Digital Media Tbk
51	AXIO	Tera Data Indonusa Tbk
52	AYAM	Janu Putra Sejahtera Tbk
53	AYLS	Agro Yasa Lestari Tbk
54	BABY	Multitrend Indo Tbk
55	BAIK	Bersama Mencapai Puncak Tbk
56	BALI	Bali Towerindo Sentra Tbk
57	BANK	Bank Aladin Syariah Tbk
58	BAPA	Bekasi Asri Pemula Tbk
59	BAPI	Bhakti Agung Propertindo Tbk
60	BATA	Sepatu Bata Tbk
61	BATR	Benteng Api Technic Tbk.
62	BAUT	Mitra Angkasa Sejahtera Tbk
63	BAYU	Bayu Buana Tbk
64	BBRM	Pelayaran Nasional Bina Buana Raya Tbk
65	BCIP	Bumi Citra Permai Tbk
66	BDKR	Berdikari Pondasi Perkasa Tbk
67	BEBS	Berkah Beton Sadaya Tbk
68	BEEF	Estika Tata Tiara Tbk
69	BELI	Global Digital Niaga Tbk
70	BELL	Trisula Textile Industries Tbk
71	BESS	Batulicin Nusantara Maritim Tbk
72	BEST	Bekasi Fajar Industrial Estate Tbk
73	BIKE	Sepeda Bersama Indonesia Tbk
74	BIMA	Primarindo Asia Infrastructure Tbk
75	BINO	Perma Plasindo Tbk
76	BIPP	Bhuwanatala Indah Permai Tbk
77	BIRD	Blue Bird Tbk
78	BISI	BISI International Tbk
79	BKDP	Bukit Darmo Property Tbk
80	BKSL	Sentul City Tbk
81	BLES	Superior Prima Sukses Tbk.
82	BLTA	Berlian Laju Tanker Tbk
83	BLTZ	Graha Layar Prima Tbk
84	BLUE	Berkah Prima Perkasa Tbk
85	BMBL	Lavender Bina Cendikia Tbk
86	BMHS	Bundamedik Tbk
87	BMSR	Bintang Mitra Semestaraya Tbk
88	BMTR	Global Mediacom Tbk
89	BNBR	Bakrie & Brothers Tbk
90	BOBA	Formosa Ingredient Factory Tbk
91	BOGA	Bintang Oto Global Tbk
92	BOLT	Garuda Metalindo Tbk
93	BRAM	Indo Kordsa Tbk
94	BRIS	Bank Syariah Indonesia Tbk
95	BRMS	Bumi Resources Minerals Tbk
96	BRPT	Barito Pacific Tbk
97	BSBK	Wulandari Bangun Laksana Tbk
98	BSDE	Bumi Serpong Damai Tbk
99	BSML	Bintang Samudera Mandiri Lines Tbk
100	BSSR	Baramulti Suksessarana Tbk
101	BTON	Betonjaya Manunggal Tbk
102	BTPS	Bank BTPN Syariah Tbk
103	BUAH	Segar Kumala Indonesia Tbk
104	BUDI	Budi Starch & Sweetener Tbk
105	BUKK	Bukaka Teknik Utama Tbk
106	BULL	Buana Lintas Lautan Tbk
107	BUMI	Bumi Resources Tbk
108	BYAN	Bayan Resources Tbk
109	CAKK	Cahayaputra Asa Keramik Tbk
110	CAMP	Campina Ice Cream Industry Tbk
111	CANI	Capitol Nusantara Indonesia Tbk
112	CARE	Metro Healthcare Indonesia Tbk
113	CASH	Cashlez Worldwide Indonesia Tbk.
114	CASS	Cardig Aero Services Tbk
115	CBPE	Citra Buana Prasida Tbk
116	CBRE	Cakra Buana Resources Energi Tbk
117	CCSI	Communication Cable Systems Indonesia Tbk
118	CEKA	Wilmar Cahaya Indonesia Tbk
119	CGAS	Citra Nusantara Gemilang Tbk
120	CHEM	Chemstar Indonesia Tbk
121	CHIP	Pelita Teknologi Global Tbk
122	CINT	Chitose Internasional Tbk
123	CITA	Cita Mineral Investindo Tbk
124	CITY	Natura City Developments Tbk
125	CLEO	Sariguna Primatirta Tbk
126	CLPI	Colorpak Indonesia Tbk
127	CMNP	Citra Marga Nusaphala Persada Tbk
128	CMPP	AirAsia Indonesia Tbk
129	CMRY	Cisarua Mountain Dairy Tbk
130	CNMA	Nusantara Sejahtera Raya Tbk
131	CPIN	Charoen Pokphand Indonesia Tbk
132	CPRO	Central Proteina Prima Tbk
133	CRAB	Toba Surimi Industries Tbk
134	CRSN	Carsurin Tbk
135	CSAP	Catur Sentosa Adiprana Tbk
136	CSIS	Cahayasakti Investindo Sukses Tbk
137	CSMI	Cipta Selera Murni Tbk
138	CSRA	Cisadane Sawit Raya Tbk
139	CTBN	Citra Tubindo Tbk
140	CTRA	Ciputra Development Tbk
141	CUAN	Petrindo Jaya Kreasi Tbk
142	CYBR	ITSEC Asia Tbk
143	DADA	Diamond Citra Propertindo Tbk
144	DATA	Remala Abadi Tbk
145	DAYA	Duta Intidaya Tbk
146	DCII	DCI Indonesia Tbk
147	DEPO	Caturkarda Depo Bangunan Tbk
148	DEWA	Darma Henwa Tbk
149	DEWI	Dewi Shri Farmindo Tbk
150	DGIK	Nusa Konstruksi Enjiniring Tbk
151	DGNS	Diagnos Laboratorium Utama Tbk
152	DILD	Intiland Development Tbk
153	DIVA	Distribusi Voucher Nusantara Tbk
154	DKFT	Central Omega Resources Tbk
155	DMAS	Puradelta Lestari Tbk
156	DMMX	Digital Mediatama Maxima Tbk
157	DMND	Diamond Food Indonesia Tbk
158	DOOH	Era Media Sejahtera Tbk
159	DOSS	PT Global Sukses Digital Tbk
160	DPNS	Duta Pertiwi Nusantara Tbk
161	DRMA	Dharma Polimetal Tbk
162	DSFI	Dharma Samudera Fishing Industries Tbk
163	DSNG	Dharma Satya Nusantara Tbk
164	DSSA	Dian Swastatika Sentosa Tbk
165	DUTI	Duta Pertiwi Tbk
166	DVLA	Darya-Varia Laboratoria Tbk
167	DWGL	Dwi Guna Laksana Tbk
168	DYAN	Dyandra Media International Tbk
169	EAST	Eastparc Hotel Tbk
170	ECII	Electronic City Indonesia Tbk
171	EDGE	Indointernet Tbk
172	EKAD	Ekadharma International Tbk
173	ELIT	Data Sinergitama Jaya Tbk
174	ELPI	Pelayaran Nasional Ekalya Purnamasari Tbk
175	ELSA	Elnusa Tbk
176	ELTY	Bakrieland Development Tbk
177	EMDE	Megapolitan Developments Tbk
178	EMTK	Elang Mahkota Teknologi Tbk
179	ENAK	Champ Resto Indonesia Tbk
180	ENRG	Energi Mega Persada Tbk
181	ENZO	Morenzo Abadi Perkasa Tbk
182	EPAC	Megalestari Epack Sentosaraya Tbk
183	EPMT	Enseval Putera Megatrading Tbk
184	ERAA	Erajaya Swasembada Tbk
185	ERAL	Sinar Eka Selaras Tbk
186	ESIP	Sinergi Inti Plastindo Tbk
187	ESSA	ESSA Industries Indonesia Tbk
188	ESTA	Esta Multi Usaha Tbk
189	ESTI	Ever Shine Textile Industry Tbk
190	EURO	Estee Gold Feet Tbk.
191	EXCL	XL Axiata Tbk
192	FAPA	FAP Agri Tbk
193	FAST	Fast Food Indonesia Tbk
194	FILM	MD Pictures Tbk
195	FIMP	Fimperkasa Utama Tbk.
196	FIRE	Alfa Energi Investama Tbk
197	FISH	FKS Multi Agro Tbk
198	FLMC	Falmaco Nonwoven Industri Tbk
199	FMII	Fortune Mate Indonesia Tbk
200	FOLK	Multi Garam Utama Tbk
201	FOOD	Sentra Food Indonesia Tbk
202	FORU	Fortune Indonesia Tbk
203	FPNI	Lotte Chemical Titan Tbk
204	FREN	Smartfren Telecom Tbk
205	FUTR	Lini Imaji Kreasi Ekosistem Tbk
206	FWCT	Wijaya Cahaya Timber Tbk
207	GDST	Gunawan Dianjaya Steel Tbk
208	GDYR	Goodyear Indonesia Tbk
209	GEMA	Gema Grahasarana Tbk
210	GEMS	Golden Energy Mines Tbk
211	GGRP	Gunung Raja Paksi Tbk
212	GHON	Gihon Telekomunikasi Indonesia Tbk
213	GIAA	Garuda Indonesia (Persero) Tbk
214	GJTL	Gajah Tunggal Tbk
215	GLVA	Galva Technologies Tbk
216	GMTD	Gowa Makassar Tourism Development Tbk
217	GOLD	Visi Telekomunikasi Infrastruktur Tbk
218	GOLF	Intra Golflink Resorts Tbk
219	GOOD	Garudafood Putra Putri Jaya Tbk
220	GOTO	GoTo Gojek Tokopedia Tbk
221	GPRA	Perdana Gapuraprima Tbk
222	GPSO	Geoprima Solusi Tbk
223	GRIA	Ingria Pratama Capitalindo Tbk
224	GRPH	Griptha Putra Persada Tbk
225	GRPM	Graha Prima Mentari Tbk.
226	GTBO	Garda Tujuh Buana Tbk
227	GTSI	GTS Internasional Tbk
228	GULA	Aman Agrindo Tbk
229	GUNA	PT Global Sukses Digital Tbk
230	GWSA	Greenwood Sejahtera Tbk
231	GZCO	Gozco Plantations Tbk
232	HAIS	Hasnur Internasional Shipping Tbk
233	HAJJ	Arsy Buana Travelindo Tbk.
234	HALO	Haloni Jane Tbk
235	HATM	Habco Trans Maritima Tbk
236	HBAT	Minahasa Membangun Hebat Tbk
237	HDIT	Hensel Davest Indonesia Tbk
238	HEAL	Medikaloka Hermina Tbk
239	HERO	Hero Supermarket Tbk
240	HEXA	Hexindo Adiperkasa Tbk
241	HITS	Humpuss Intermoda Transportasi Tbk
242	HOKI	Buyung Poetra Sembada Tbk
243	HOMI	Grand House Mulia Tbk
244	HOPE	Harapan Duta Pertiwi Tbk
245	HRME	Menteng Heritage Realty Tbk
246	HRUM	Harum Energy Tbk
247	HUMI	Humpuss Maritim Internasional Tbk
248	HYGN	Ecocare Indo Pasifik Tbk
249	IATA	MNC Energy Investments Tbk
250	IBST	Inti Bangun Sejahtera Tbk
251	ICBP	Indofood CBP Sukses Makmur Tbk
252	ICON	Island Concepts Indonesia Tbk
253	IDEA	Idea Indonesia Akademi Tbk.
254	IDPR	Indonesia Pondasi Raya Tbk
255	IFII	Indonesia Fibreboard Industry Tbk
256	IFSH	Ifishdeco Tbk
257	IGAR	Champion Pacific Indonesia Tbk
258	IIKP	Inti Agri Resources Tbk
259	IKAN	Era Mandiri Cemerlang Tbk
260	IKBI	Sumi Indo Kabel Tbk
261	IKPM	Ikapharmindo Putramas Tbk
262	IMPC	Impack Pratama Industri Tbk
263	INCI	Intanwijaya Internasional Tbk
264	INCO	Vale Indonesia Tbk
265	INDF	Indofood Sukses Makmur Tbk
266	INDR	Indo-Rama Synthetics Tbk
267	INDS	Indospring Tbk
268	INDX	Tanah Laut Tbk
269	INDY	Indika Energy Tbk
270	INET	Sinergi Inti Andalan Prima Tbk
271	INKP	Indah Kiat Pulp & Paper Tbk
272	INTD	Inter Delta Tbk
273	INTP	Indocement Tunggal Prakarsa Tbk
274	IOTF	Sumber Sinergi Makmur Tbk
275	IPAC	Era Graharealty Tbk.
276	IPCC	Indonesia Kendaraan Terminal Tbk
277	IPCM	Jasa Armada Indonesia Tbk
278	IPOL	Indopoly Swakarsa Industry Tbk
279	IPPE	Indo Pureco Pratama Tbk
280	IPTV	MNC Vision Networks Tbk
281	IRRA	Itama Ranoraya Tbk
282	IRSX	Aviana Sinar Abadi Tbk
283	ISAP	Isra Presisi Indonesia Tbk.
284	ISAT	Indosat Tbk
285	ISSP	Steel Pipe Industry of Indonesia Tbk
286	ITMA	Sumber Energi Andalan Tbk
287	ITMG	Indo Tambangraya Megah Tbk
288	JAST	Jasnita Telekomindo Tbk
289	JATI	Informasi Teknologi Indonesia Tbk
290	JAYA	Armada Berjaya Trans Tbk
291	JECC	Jembo Cable Company Tbk
292	JGLE	Graha Andrasentra Propertindo Tbk
293	JIHD	Jakarta International Hotels & Development Tbk
294	JKON	Jaya Konstruksi Manggala Pratama Tbk
295	JMAS	Asuransi Jiwa Syariah Jasa Mitra Abadi Tbk
296	JPFA	Japfa Comfeed Indonesia Tbk
297	JRPT	Jaya Real Property Tbk
298	JSPT	Jakarta Setiabudi Internasional Tbk
299	JTPE	Jasuindo Tiga Perkasa Tbk
300	KARW	ICTSI Jasa Prima Tbk
301	KBAG	Karya Bersama Anugerah Tbk
302	KBLI	KMI Wire and Cable Tbk
303	KBLM	Kabelindo Murni Tbk
304	KBLV	First Media Tbk
305	KDSI	Kedawung Setia Industrial Tbk
306	KDTN	Puri Sentul Permai Tbk
307	KEEN	Kencana Energi Lestari Tbk
308	KEJU	Mulia Boga Raya Tbk
309	KIAS	Keramika Indonesia Assosiasi Tbk
310	KICI	Kedaung Indah Can Tbk
311	KIJA	Kawasan Industri Jababeka Tbk
312	KING	Hoffmen Cleanindo Tbk
313	KINO	Kino Indonesia Tbk
314	KIOS	Kioson Komersial Indonesia Tbk
315	KJEN	Krida Jaringan Nusantara Tbk
316	KKES	Kusuma Kemindo Sentosa Tbk
317	KKGI	Resource Alam Indonesia Tbk
318	KLAS	Pelayaran Kurnia Lautan Semesta Tbk
319	KLBF	Kalbe Farma Tbk
320	KLIN	Klinko Karya Imaji Tbk.
321	KMDS	Kurniamitra Duta Sentosa Tbk
322	KOBX	Kobexindo Tractors Tbk
323	KOCI	Kokoh Exa Nusantara Tbk
324	KOIN	Kokoh Inti Arebama Tbk
325	KOKA	Koka Indonesia Tbk
326	KONI	Perdana Bangun Pusaka Tbk
327	KOPI	Mitra Energi Persada Tbk
328	KOTA	DMS Propertindo Tbk
329	KPIG	MNC Land Tbk
330	KREN	Quantum Clovera Investama Tbk
331	KRYA	Bangun Karya Perkasa Jaya Tbk
332	KUAS	Ace Oldfields Tbk
333	LABA	Ladangbaja Murni Tbk
334	LABS	UBC Medical Indonesia Tbk
335	LAJU	Jasa Berdikari Logistics Tbk
336	LAND	Trimitra Propertindo Tbk
337	LCKM	LCK Global Kedaton Tbk
338	LFLO	Imago Mulia Persada Tbk.
339	LION	Lion Metal Works Tbk
340	LIVE	Homeco Victoria Makmur Tbk
341	LMAX	Lupromax Pelumas Indonesia Tbk
342	LMPI	Langgeng Makmur Industri Tbk
343	LMSH	Lionmesh Prima Tbk
344	LOPI	Logisticsplus International Tbk
345	LPCK	Lippo Cikarang Tbk
346	LPIN	Multi Prima Sejahtera Tbk
347	LPKR	Lippo Karawaci Tbk
348	LPLI	Star Pacific Tbk
349	LPPF	Matahari Department Store Tbk
350	LRNA	Eka Sari Lorena Transport Tbk
351	LSIP	Perusahaan Perkebunan London Sumatra Indonesia Tbk
352	LTLS	Lautan Luas Tbk
353	LUCK	Sentral Mitra Informatika Tbk
354	MAHA	Mandiri Herindo Adiperkasa Tbk
355	MAIN	Malindo Feedmill Tbk
356	MANG	Manggung Polahraya Tbk.
357	MAPA	MAP Aktif Adiperkasa Tbk
358	MAPB	MAP Boga Adiperkasa Tbk
359	MAPI	Mitra Adiperkasa Tbk
360	MARK	Mark Dynamics Indonesia Tbk
361	MASA	Multistrada Arah Sarana Tbk
362	MAXI	Maxindo Karya Anugerah Tbk
363	MBAP	Mitrabara Adiperdana Tbk
364	MBMA	Merdeka Battery Materials Tbk
365	MBSS	Mitrabahtera Segara Sejati Tbk
366	MBTO	Martina Berto Tbk
367	MCAS	M Cash Integrasi Tbk
368	MCOL	Prima Andalan Mandiri Tbk
369	MDKA	Merdeka Copper Gold Tbk
370	MDKI	Emdeki Utama Tbk
371	MEDC	Medco Energi Internasional Tbk
372	MEDS	Hetzer Medical Indonesia Tbk
373	MEJA	Harta Djaya Karya Tbk
374	MENN	PT Menn Teknologi Indonesia Tbk
375	MERK	Merck Tbk
376	META	Nusantara Infrastructure Tbk
377	MFMI	Multifiling Mitra Indonesia Tbk
378	MGLV	Panca Anugrah Wisesa Tbk.
379	MGNA	Magna Investama Mandiri Tbk
380	MHKI	Multi Hanna Kreasindo Tbk
381	MICE	Multi Indocitra Tbk
382	MIDI	Midi Utama Indonesia Tbk
383	MIKA	Mitra Keluarga Karyasehat Tbk
384	MINA	Sanurhasta Mitra Tbk
385	MIRA	Mitra International Resources Tbk
386	MITI	Mitra Investindo Tbk
387	MKAP	Multikarya Asia Pasifik Raya Tbk
388	MKPI	Metropolitan Kentjana Tbk
389	MKTR	Menthobi Karyatama Raya Tbk
390	MLIA	Mulia Industrindo Tbk
391	MLPL	Multipolar Tbk
392	MLPT	Multipolar Technology Tbk
393	MMIX	Multi Medika Internasional Tbk
394	MMLP	Mega Manunggal Property Tbk
395	MNCN	Media Nusantara Citra Tbk
396	MORA	Mora Telematika Indonesia Tbk
397	MPIX	Mitra Pedagang Indonesia Tbk
398	MPMX	Mitra Pinasthika Mustika Tbk
399	MPOW	Megapower Makmur Tbk
400	MPPA	Matahari Putra Prima Tbk
401	MPRO	Maha Properti Indonesia Tbk
402	MPXL	MPX Logistics International Tbk
403	MSIE	Multisarana Intan Eduka Tbk
404	MSJA	Multi Spunindo Jaya Tbk
405	MSKY	MNC Sky Vision Tbk
406	MSTI	Mastersystem Infotama Tbk
407	MTDL	Metrodata Electronics Tbk
408	MTEL	Dayamitra Telekomunikasi Tbk
409	MTLA	Metropolitan Land Tbk
410	MTMH	Murni Sadar Tbk
411	MTSM	Metro Realty Tbk
412	MUTU	Mutuagung Lestari Tbk
413	MYOH	Samindo Resources Tbk
414	MYOR	Mayora Indah Tbk
415	NANO	Nanotech Indonesia Global Tbk.
416	NASA	Andalan Perkasa Abadi Tbk
417	NASI	Wahana Inti Makmur Tbk
418	NAYZ	Hassana Boga Sejahtera Tbk
419	NELY	Pelayaran Nelly Dwi Putri Tbk
420	NEST	PT Esta Indonesia Tbk
421	NFCX	NFC Indonesia Tbk
422	NICE	Adhi Kartiko Pratama Tbk
423	NICL	PAM Mineral Tbk
424	NIKL	Pelat Timah Nusantara Tbk
425	NINE	Techno9 Indonesia Tbk
426	NPGF	Nusa Palapa Gemilang Tbk
427	NRCA	Nusa Raya Cipta Tbk
428	NTBK	Nusatama Berkah Tbk
429	NZIA	Nusantara Almazia Tbk
430	OBMD	OBM Drilchem Tbk
431	OILS	Indo Oil Perkasa Tbk
432	OKAS	Ancora Indonesia Resources Tbk
433	OLIV	Oscar Mitra Sukses Sejahtera Tbk.
434	OMED	Jayamas Medica Industri Tbk
435	OMRE	Indonesia Prima Property Tbk
436	OPMS	Optima Prima Metal Sinergi Tbk
437	PACK	Solusi Kemasan Digital Tbk
438	PADA	Personel Alih Daya Tbk
439	PALM	Provident Investasi Bersama Tbk
440	PAMG	Bima Sakti Pertiwi Tbk
441	PANI	Pantai Indah Kapuk Dua Tbk
442	PANR	Panorama Sentrawisata Tbk
443	PBID	Panca Budi Idaman Tbk
444	PBSA	Paramita Bangun Sarana Tbk
445	PCAR	Prima Cakrawala Abadi Tbk
446	PDPP	Primadaya Plastisindo Tbk
447	PEHA	Phapros Tbk
448	PEVE	Penta Valent Tbk
449	PGAS	Perusahaan Gas Negara Tbk
450	PGEO	Pertamina Geothermal Energy Tbk
451	PGJO	Tourindo Guide Indonesia Tbk.
452	PGLI	Pembangunan Graha Lestari Indah Tbk
453	PGUN	Pradiksi Gunatama Tbk
454	PIPA	Multi Makmur Lemindo Tbk
455	PJAA	Pembangunan Jaya Ancol Tbk
456	PKPK	Perdana Karya Perkasa Tbk
457	PLAN	Planet Properindo Jaya Tbk.
458	PLIN	Plaza Indonesia Realty Tbk
459	PMJS	Putra Mandiri Jembar Tbk
460	PNBS	Bank Panin Dubai Syariah Tbk
461	PNGO	Pinago Utama Tbk
462	PNSE	Pudjiadi & Sons Tbk
463	POLI	Pollux Hotels Group Tbk
464	PORT	Nusantara Pelabuhan Handal Tbk
465	POWR	Cikarang Listrindo Tbk
466	PPGL	Prima Globalindo Logistik Tbk.
467	PPRE	PP Presisi Tbk
468	PPRI	Paperocks Indonesia Tbk
469	PRAY	Famon Awal Bros Sedaya Tbk
470	PRDA	Prodia Widyahusada Tbk
471	PRIM	Royal Prima Tbk
472	PSAB	J Resources Asia Pasifik Tbk
473	PSDN	Prasidha Aneka Niaga Tbk
474	PSGO	Palma Serasih Tbk
475	PSKT	Red Planet Indonesia Tbk
476	PSSI	IMC Pelita Logistik Tbk
477	PTBA	Bukit Asam Tbk
478	PTIS	Indo Straits Tbk
479	PTMP	Mitra Pack Tbk
480	PTMR	Master Print Tbk
481	PTPP	PP (Persero) Tbk
482	PTPS	Pulau Subur Tbk
483	PTPW	Pratama Widya Tbk
484	PTRO	Petrosea Tbk
485	PTSN	Sat Nusapersada Tbk
486	PTSP	Pioneerindo Gourmet International Tbk
487	PURA	Putra Rajawali Kencana Tbk
488	PURI	Puri Global Sukses Tbk
489	PWON	Pakuwon Jati Tbk
490	PZZA	Sarimelati Kencana Tbk
491	RAAM	Tripar Multivision Plus Tbk
492	RAFI	Sari Kreasi Boga Tbk
493	RAJA	Rukun Raharja Tbk
494	RALS	Ramayana Lestari Sentosa Tbk
495	RANC	Supra Boga Lestari Tbk
496	RBMS	Ristia Bintang Mahkotasejati Tbk
497	RCCC	Utama Radar Cahaya Tbk.
498	RDTX	Roda Vivatex Tbk
499	REAL	Repower Asia Indonesia Tbk
500	RELF	Graha Mitra Asia Tbk.
501	RGAS	Kian Santang Muliatama Tbk
502	RIGS	Rig Tenders Tbk
503	RISE	Jaya Sukses Makmur Sentosa Tbk
504	RMKE	RMK Energy Tbk
505	ROCK	Rockfields Properti Indonesia Tbk
506	RODA	Pikko Land Development Tbk
507	RONY	Aesler Grup Internasional Tbk
508	ROTI	Nippon Indosari Corpindo Tbk
509	RSCH	Charlie Hospital Semarang Tbk
510	RSGK	Kedoya Adyaraya Tbk
511	RUIS	Radiant Utama Interinsco Tbk
512	RUNS	Global Sukses Solusi Tbk.
513	SAGE	Saptausaha Gemilangindah Tbk
514	SAME	Sarana Meditama Metropolitan Tbk
515	SAMF	Saraswanti Anugerah Makmur Tbk
516	SAPX	Satria Antaran Prima Tbk
517	SATU	Kota Satu Properti Tbk
518	SBMA	Surya Biru Murni Acetylene Tbk
519	SCCO	Supreme Cable Manufacturing & Commerce Tbk
520	SCMA	Surya Citra Media Tbk
521	SCNP	Selaras Citra Nusantara Perkasa Tbk
522	SCPI	Organon Pharma Indonesia Tbk
523	SDPC	Millennium Pharmacon International Tbk
524	SEMA	Semacom Integrated Tbk
525	SGER	Sumber Global Energy Tbk
526	SGRO	Sampoerna Agro Tbk
527	SHID	Hotel Sahid Jaya International Tbk
528	SICO	Sigma Energy Compressindo Tbk
529	SIDO	Industri Jamu dan Farmasi Sido Muncul Tbk
530	SILO	Siloam International Hospitals Tbk
531	SIMP	Salim Ivomas Pratama Tbk
532	SIPD	Sreeya Sewu Indonesia Tbk
533	SKBM	Sekar Bumi Tbk
534	SKLT	Sekar Laut Tbk
535	SKRN	Superkrane Mitra Utama Tbk
536	SLIS	Gaya Abadi Sempurna Tbk
537	SMAR	Sinar Mas Agro Resources and Technology Tbk
538	SMBR	Semen Baturaja (Persero) Tbk
539	SMCB	Solusi Bangun Indonesia Tbk
540	SMDM	Suryamas Dutamakmur Tbk
541	SMDR	Samudera Indonesia Tbk
542	SMGA	Sumber Mineral Global Abadi Tbk
543	SMGR	Semen Indonesia (Persero) Tbk
544	SMIL	Sarana Mitra Luas Tbk
545	SMKL	Satyamitra Kemas Lestari Tbk
546	SMKM	Sumber Mas Konstruksi Tbk.
547	SMLE	Sinergi Multi Lestarindo Tbk
548	SMMT	Golden Eagle Energy Tbk
549	SMRA	Summarecon Agung Tbk
550	SMSM	Selamat Sempurna Tbk
551	SNLK	Sunter Lakeside Hotel Tbk
552	SOCI	Soechi Lines Tbk
553	SOFA	Boston Furniture Industries Tbk.
554	SOHO	Soho Global Health Tbk
555	SOLA	Xolare RCR Energy Tbk
556	SONA	Sona Topas Tourism Industry Tbk
557	SOSS	Shield On Service Tbk
558	SOTS	Satria Mega Kencana Tbk
559	SOUL	Mitra Tirta Buwana Tbk
560	SPMA	Suparma Tbk
561	SPRE	Soraya Berjaya Indonesia Tbk
562	SPTO	Surya Pertiwi Tbk
563	SRAJ	Sejahteraraya Anugrahjaya Tbk
564	SRTG	Saratoga Investama Sedaya Tbk
565	SSIA	Surya Semesta Internusa Tbk
566	SSTM	Sunson Textile Manufacturer Tbk
567	STAA	Sumber Tani Agung Resources Tbk
568	STTP	Siantar Top Tbk
569	SULI	SLJ Global Tbk
570	SUNI	Sunindo Pratama Tbk
571	SUPR	Solusi Tunas Pratama Tbk
572	SURI	Maja Agung Latexindo Tbk
573	SWID	Saraswanti Indoland Development Tbk
574	TALF	Tunas Alfin Tbk
575	TAMA	Lancartama Sejati Tbk
576	TAMU	Pelayaran Tamarin Samudra Tbk
577	TAPG	Triputra Agro Persada Tbk
578	TAXI	Express Transindo Utama Tbk
579	TAYS	Jaya Swarasa Agung Tbk
580	TBMS	Tembaga Mulia Semanan Tbk
581	TCID	Mandom Indonesia Tbk
582	TCPI	Transcoal Pacific Tbk
583	TEBE	Dana Brata Luhur Tbk
584	TFAS	Telefast Indonesia Tbk
585	TFCO	Tifico Fiber Indonesia Tbk
586	TGKA	Tigaraksa Satria Tbk
587	TGUK	Platinum Wahab Nusantara Tbk
588	TINS	Timah Tbk
589	TIRA	Tira Austenite Tbk
590	TKIM	Pabrik Kertas Tjiwi Kimia Tbk
591	TLDN	Teladan Prima Agro Tbk
592	TLKM	Telekomunikasi Indonesia (Persero) Tbk
593	TMAS	Temas Tbk
594	TMPO	Tempo Inti Media Tbk
595	TNCA	Trimuda Nuansa Citra Tbk
596	TOOL	Rohartindo Nusantara Luas Tbk
597	TOSK	Topindo Solusi Komunika Tbk
598	TOTL	Total Bangun Persada Tbk
599	TOTO	Surya Toto Indonesia Tbk
600	TOYS	Sunindo Adipersada Tbk
601	TPIA	Chandra Asri Petrochemical Tbk
602	TPMA	Trans Power Marine Tbk
603	TRIS	Trisula International Tbk
604	TRON	Teknologi Karya Digital Nusa Tbk
605	TRST	Trias Sentosa Tbk
606	TRUE	Triniti Dinamik Tbk
607	TRUK	Guna Timur Raya Tbk
608	TSPC	Tempo Scan Pacific Tbk
609	TYRE	King Tire Indonesia Tbk
610	UANG	Pakuan Tbk
611	UCID	Uni-Charm Indonesia Tbk
612	UDNG	Agro Bahari Nusantara Tbk
613	UFOE	Damai Sejahtera Abadi Tbk
614	ULTJ	Ultrajaya Milk Industry & Trading Company Tbk
615	UNIC	Unggul Indah Cahaya Tbk
616	UNIQ	Ulima Nitra Tbk
617	UNTR	United Tractors Tbk
618	UNVR	Unilever Indonesia Tbk
619	UVCR	Trimegah Karya Pratama Tbk
620	VAST	Vastland Indonesia Tbk
621	VERN	Verona Indah Pictures Tbk
622	VICI	Victoria Care Indonesia Tbk
623	VISI	Satu Visi Putra Tbk
624	VKTR	VKTR Teknologi Mobilitas Tbk
625	VOKS	Voksel Electric Tbk
626	WAPO	Wahana Pronatural Tbk
627	WEGE	Wijaya Karya Bangunan Gedung Tbk
628	WEHA	Weha Transportasi Indonesia Tbk
629	WGSH	Wira Global Solusi Tbk.
630	WIDI	Widiant Jaya Krenindo Tbk
631	WIFI	Solusi Sinergi Digital Tbk
632	WINR	Winner Nusantara Jaya Tbk
633	WINS	Wintermar Offshore Marine Tbk
634	WIRG	WIR Asia Tbk
635	WMUU	Widodo Makmur Unggas Tbk
636	WOOD	Integra Indocabinet Tbk
637	WOWS	Ginting Jaya Energi Tbk
638	WTON	Wijaya Karya Beton Tbk
639	YELO	Yelooo Integra Datanet Tbk
640	YPAS	Yanaprima Hastapersada Tbk
641	ZATA	Bersama Zatta Jaya Tbk
642	ZONE	Mega Perintis Tbk
643	ZYRX	Zyrexindo Mandiri Buana Tbk

== See also ==
- Indonesia Stock Exchange
