= Surabaya Stock Exchange =

Former stock exchange of Indonesia

- Native name: Bursa Efek Surabaya
- Company type: Stock exchange
- Founded: June 16, 1989; 36 years ago
- Defunct: October 30, 2007; 18 years ago
- Fate: Merged into the Indonesia Stock Exchange with JSX
- Successor: Indonesia Stock Exchange
- Headquarters: Surabaya, Indonesia
- Key people: Bastian Purnama (last CEO)

Surabaya Stock Exchange (SSX; Indonesian: Bursa Efek Surabaya, BES) was a stock exchange that officially opened on June 16, 1989, based on the Minister of Finance Decree of Indonesia No. 654/KMK.010/1989 with only thirty-six shareholders. It was established in order to support the Indonesian government in capital markets and economic development in the East Region of Indonesia.

== History ==
Surabaya Stock Exchange was originally opened in 1925 during the Dutch colonial era, but it was closed in early 1939 due to the ongoing World War II. On 16 June 1989, the exchange restarted the operation.

On 22 July 1995, the SSX merged with the Indonesian Parallel Stock Exchange (IPSX), leaving only two primary exchanges operating in Indonesia.

On 30 October 2007, SSX was officially merged to Jakarta Stock Exchange (JSX) and becoming Indonesia Stock Exchange (IDX) as a single exchange operating in Indonesia, besides Jakarta Futures Exchange.

== Products ==
SSX trades various products, including:

- Equities (stock)
- Bonds (Government Bonds and Corporate Bonds)
- Derivatives products (Japan Futures, LQ45 Futures, and Mini LQ45 Futures)

== See also ==
- Indonesia Stock Exchange
- Jakarta Stock Exchange
