= United Tractors =

Indonesian company

PT United Tractors Tbk
- Company type: Public
- Traded as: IDX: UNTR
- Industry: Construction machinery; Mining contracting; Coal mining; Gold mining; Construction industry; Energy
- Founded: 13 October 1972; 53 years ago
- Headquarters: Jakarta, Indonesia
- Area served: Indonesia
- Key people: Frans Kesuma (President Director); Djony Bunarto Tjondro (President Commissioner)
- Revenue: ▲ Rp 123.607 trillion (2022)
- Net income: ▲ Rp 21.005 trillion (2022)
- Total assets: ▲ Rp 140.478 trillion (2022)
- Total equity: ▲ Rp 89.513 trillion (2022)
- Owner: PT Astra International Tbk (59,5%)
- Number of employees: 32,682 (2022)
- Website: www.unitedtractors.com

PT United Tractors Tbk (also known as UT or UT Company) is an Indonesian company, subsidiary of PT Astra International Tbk ("Astra") that operates in six business lines, namely Construction Machinery, Mining Contractor, Coal Mining, Gold Mining, Construction Industry, and Energy. United Tractors has 20 branch offices, 32 site supports, 6 representative offices, and 54 support points as well as other service installations.

== History ==
=== 1972 ===
The company was established under the name of PT Inter-Astra Motor Works with a focus on heavy equipment distribution. On October 13, 1972, the Company changed its name to PT United Tractors.

=== 1973 ===
Became the sole distributor of Komatsu and Tadano products in Indonesia.

=== 1974 ===
Became the sole distributor of Bomag vibratory rollers and started selling Komatsu forklifts.

=== 1983 ===
Established PT United Tractors Pandu Engineering ("UTPE") to enter the engineering and manufacturing industry of heavy equipment components and attachments.

=== 1984 ===
Became the sole distributor of UD Trucks (previously known as Nissan Diesel).

=== 1989 ===
- The Company expanded its business line to mining contractor services by establishing PT Pamapersada Nusantara ("PAMA").
- The company's shares were officially listed on the Jakarta Stock Exchange and Surabaya Stock Exchange on September 19, 1989.

=== 1992 ===
Established PT United Tractors Semen Gresik ("UTSG") as a joint venture with PT Semen Indonesia (Persero) (previously PT Semen Gresik) to carry out quarry and limestone mining projects.

=== 1995 ===
Established UT Heavy Industry (S) Pte, Ltd., based in Singapore, as an extension of heavy equipment import distribution to Indonesia.

=== 1997 ===
Established PT Komatsu Remanufacturing Asia ("KRA") in Balikpapan to provide Komatsu engine and component reconditioning services.

=== 2004 ===
Appointed as the official sole distributor of Scania products.

=== 2007 ===
PAMA acquired PT Prima Multi Mineral ("PMM"), which holds mining concession rights in Rantau, South Kalimantan.

=== 2008 ===
- Acquired PT Tuah Turangga Agung ("Turangga Resources") located in Kapuas, Central Kalimantan.
- Established PT Multi Prima Universal ("MPU") to provide machine rental services and used machine sales.
- Established PT Patria Maritime Lines ("PML") through UTPE, to provide coal transportation services by river.

=== 2010 ===
- Established PT Andalan Multi Kencana ("AMK") which focuses on commodity parts distribution.
- Through Turangga Resources, acquired PT Agung Bara Prima ("ABP") which has mining concessions in Kapuas, Central Kalimantan.

=== 2011 ===
- Established PT Universal Tekno Reksajaya ("UTR") to provide engine and component reconditioning services.
- Through PAMA and Turangga Resources, acquired companies with other concession rights, including PT Bukit Enim Energi ("BEE"), PT Asmin Bara Bronang ("ABB"), PT Agung Bara Jaan ("ABJ"), PT Duta Sejahtera ("DS"), and PT Duta Nurcahya ("DN").
- UTPE established PT Patria Maritime Industry ("PAMI") to provide ship repair and maintenance services.

=== 2012 ===
- Turangga Resources acquired PT Borneo Berkat Makmur ("BBM"), which owns 60% of the shares of PT Piranti Jaya Utama ("PJU"), a mining company with mining concession rights in Kapuas, Central Kalimantan.
- UTPE acquired PT Patria Maritime Perkasa ("PMP") (formerly Perkasa Melati) to enter the ship repair and manufacturing industry in Batam, Riau Islands.

=== 2013 ===
PAMA increased its ownership stake in ABB and ABJ by 15%, thus now controlling 75.4% of ABB and ABJ's shares.

=== 2014 ===
Restructuring of the mining business line where all mining subsidiaries come under Turangga Resources, with the Company and PAMA each owning 40% and 60% of Turangga Resources' shares, respectively.

=== 2015 ===
- Formation of the fourth business line, Construction Industry, by acquiring 50.1% ownership of PT Acset Indonusa Tbk ("ACSET").
- PAMA acquired 80% ownership of PT Sumbawa Juta Raya ("SJR"), a gold mining exploration company in Sumbawa, West Nusa Tenggara.
- Establishment of PT Unitra Persada Energia ("UPE"), engaged in the field of power generation.

=== 2016 ===
Through Turangga Resources, signing of a Conditional Shares and Purchase Agreement related to the purchase of 80.1% of PT Suprabari Mapanindo Mineral ("SMM"), a metallurgical coal mining concession located in Central Kalimantan.

=== 2017 ===
- Formation of the fifth business line, Energy, through the subsidiary PT Bhumi Jati Power ("BJP"), as an Independent Power Producer (IPP).
- Through Turangga Resources, completion of the acquisition of 80.1% ownership in SMM, a metallurgical coal concession in Central Kalimantan.
- Through BJP, completion of project financing agreements to build and operate a 2x1,000 MW coal-fired power plant in Jepara, Central Java.

=== 2018 ===
Through its subsidiary PT Danusa Tambang Nusantara ("DTN"), acquisition of 95% ownership of PT Agincourt Resources ("PTAR"), a company engaged in gold mineral exploration, mining, and processing in North Sumatra.

=== 2019 ===
Formation of the sixth business line, Gold Mining, operated by PTAR.

=== 2020 ===
In August, ACSET conducted a Limited Public Offering II (PUT II) by issuing 5,725,160,000 new shares. After PUT II, UT's ownership of ACSET through PT Karya Supra Perkasa ("KSP") became 64.8%.

=== 2021 ===
- In July, the Company through KSP sold all of its 51% ownership in PT Supra Alphaplus Handal ("SAH").
- In August, ACSET conducted a Capital Increase without Preemptive Rights (HMETD) by issuing 6,250,000,000 new shares. After HMETD, UT's ownership of ACSET through KSP became 82.17%.
- In December, the Company carried out internal restructuring of the company's group. All subsidiaries under PT Bina Pertiwi ("BP") engaged in renewable energy were transferred to PT Energia Prima Nusantara ("EPN").

=== 2022 ===
- The Company expanded its portfolio of renewable energy by investing in PT Arkora Hydro Tbk ("Arkora") with a 31.49% ownership stake. The Company diversified its business by developing in the nickel sector.
- Through its subsidiary DTN, it signed a Conditional Shares Sale and Purchase Agreement (CSPA) to acquire 90% ownership of PT Stargate Pasific Resources (SPR) and 90% ownership of PT Stargate Mineral Asia (SMA).

== Business Lines ==
The business field of United Tractors is divided into six lines of business, namely:

=== Construction Machinery ===
The Construction Machinery business pillar focuses on the sale of heavy equipment and transportation equipment. This business segment has been an important segment since the inception of United Tractors and offers a variety of reliable products that can support business activities in various sectors, such as mining, plantation, construction, forestry, as well as transportation and transportation.

United Tractors becomes an exclusive distributor of Komatsu products in Indonesia since 1973. As the customer base develops and there is a need for products that can support fieldwork or other industries, United Tractors provides complementary products namely Tadano cranes, vibratory rollers Bomag and UD Trucks. The company also adds Scania products to its product portfolio, including trucks and buses, which now have been supporting the public transport fleet of the Provincial Government of Jakarta.

In addition, the company also offers product engineering services and sales of other products such as engine components and attachments, through several subsidiaries. Specifically, the company established a subsidiary of PT United Tractors Pandu Engineering (“UTPE”) to offer engineering and manufacturing services for heavy equipment components and attachments, PT Komatsu Remanufacturing Asia (“KRA”) and PT Universal Tekno Reksajaya (“UTR”) to offer engine reconditioning services, and PT Bina Pertiwi (“BP”) to sell and lease Kubota agricultural tractors, Kubota and Komatsu generators, Komatsu mini excavators and Komatsu forklifts, as well as sales of commodity parts products.

=== Mining Contracting ===
United Tractors runs the Mining Contracting business through PT Pamapersada Nusantara (PAMA). PAMA is a specialist contractor that provides comprehensive mining services to mine owners.

PAMA offers mining services across all stages of production and expansion from mine design, exploration, extraction, hauling, barging, and commodity transportation. Services offered include:

- Mining design and implementation
- Initial assessment and feasibility study
- Mining infrastructure and facilities development
- Land removal and waste management
- Production and transportation of mining materials
- Mine/facility expansion
- Reclamation and re-vegetation
- Shipping and marketing

PAMA's operational activities are supported by several subsidiaries: PT Kalimantan Prima Persada (KPP) and PT PamaIndo Mining (PIM).

=== Coal Mining ===
United Tractors runs a coal mining concession business, namely thermal coal and coking coal. The coal mining business is run through its subsidiary, PT TuahTurangga Agung (“Turangga Resources”).

As the parent of the coal mining business unit, Turangga Resources holds ownership of several coal mining concessions consisting of medium and high-quality coal.

Currently, TTA is optimizing coal production from the PT Asmin Bara Bronang(ABB) mine, the PT Telen Orbit Prima (TOP) mine, and the PT SuprabariMapanindo Mineral mine.

=== Gold Mining ===
The gold mining business is run by PT Agincourt Resources (PTAR), of which United Tractors has a 95% stake. PTAR operates the Martabe gold mine, located in the South Tapanuli area of North Sumatra province, with a functional area of 479 hectares. Construction of the Martabe gold mine started in 2008 and production began in 2012.

=== Construction Industry ===
United Tractors runs the Construction Industry business through its subsidiary PT Acset Indonusa Tbk (“ACSET”). ACSET was founded in 1995 as a multi-specialized construction company providing technical and construction services for building, civil and maritime works.

ACSET's specialty integrates specialist work and general construction to effectively produce competitive costs. ACSET has completed projects such as Pacific Place, Thamrin Nine, Gandaria City, Kota Kasablanka, West Vista Jakarta, Alila Seminyak, Jakarta-Cikampek II Elevated Toll Road, and others.

=== Energy ===
In line with its business development strategy in environmentally friendly energy sector, United Tractors has initiated its focus on the New and Renewable Energy (NRE) business as one of its transition strategies in the energy sector. A number of studies, reviews and project realizations in this segment have been carried out.

First, the development of Solar Photovoltaic (Solar PV) technology. The company's subsidiary engaged in this field is PT Energia Prima Nusantara or EPN. To date, EPN has installed solar PV in a number of companies within UT and Astra group, reaching 1.2MWp. Until end of 2022, it is targeted that there will be additional new installations of 10MWp and will increase in the following year.

Next, the company also conducts studies on the development of several Hydro Power Plant projects with business partners who have a reputation and experience in the field of Hydro Power Plants (PLTA). The potential projects being targeted are in Sumatra and Sulawesi areas, each with a capacity of over 10MW.

For smaller capacity plant, the company has built two Mini-hydro Power Plants (PLTM), namely PLTMH Kalipelus with a capacity of 0.5 MW in Central Java and PLTM Besai Kemu in Lampung. The Besai Kemu PLTM which has a capacity of 7MW is currently under construction and is expected to operate by the end of 2022. In addition, the company is also developing several other PLTM projects with a total potential of more than 18MW in Sumatra area.

Aside from the aforementioned Renewable Energy projects, the company is also actively conducting studies, reviews and MoUs to develop other types of renewable energy such as Floating Solar PV, Wind Power Generation (PLTB), Hybrid Solar PV and Battery Storage, as well as Waste to Energy.

In addition, the company has a 25% share ownership in the Tanjung Jati B Power Plant (PLTU) units 5 and 6 in Jepara Regency, Central Java.

== Products ==
Brand	Products
Komatsu	Backhoe Loader Bulldozer Forwarder Hydraulic Excavator Motor Grader Off Highway Dump Truck Wheel Dozer Wheel Loader
UD Trucks	Quester Cargo Quester Dump Quester Mixer Quester Tractor Head
Scania	Mining Tipper & Heavy Hauler Trucks Mining Supporting Trucks Fuel Transport Trucks General Cargo Trucks Heavy Haulage Transport Trucks Special Vehicle Coach City Bus
BOMAG	Asphalt Finisher Cold Milling Combination Rollers Light Equipment Pneumatic Tired Rollers Refuse Compactors Single Drum Rollers Soil Compactors Stabilizer and Recycler Tandem Vibratory Rollers
Tadano	All Terrain Crane Lattice Boom Crawler Crane Rough Terrain Crane Telescopic Boom Cargo Crane Telescopic Boom Crawler Crane Truck Crane
