= Pertamina Gas Negara =

Indonesian natural gas company

Pertamina Gas Negara Tbk
- Type: Publicly listed subsidiary
- Traded as: IDX: PGAS
- Industry: Public utility
- Founded: 1965
- Headquarters: Jakarta, Indonesia
- Key people: Arief Setiawan Handoko, CEO
- Products: Natural gas
- Revenue: ▲US $ 3.848 billion (2019)
- Net income: ▲US $ 113 million (2019)
- Total assets: ▲US $ 7.373 billion (2019)
- Number of employees: 3,119 (2019)
- Parent: Pertamina
- Subsidiaries: Transgasindo Indonesia; Permata Graha Nusantara; Transportasi Gas Indonesia; Kalimantan Jawa Gas; Perta Daya Gas; PGAS Solution; Saka Energi Indonesia; Gagas Energi Indonesia; PGN LNG Indonesia
- Website: www.pgn.co.id

PT Pertamina Gas Negara Tbk (English: Pertamina State Gas, abbreviated as PGN) is an Indonesian natural gas transportation and distribution company. The total length of distribution pipelines of the company is 3,187 km that serve around 84 million customers. Formerly known as PT Perusahaan Gas Negara Tbk ('State Gas Company'), it adopted the present name and Pertamina branding in 2021.

== History ==
The Indonesian natural gas industry was initially managed by the Dutch private gas company L.J.N Eindhoven & Co., which was established in 1859. The company introduced the use of gas in Indonesia, which was at the time made from coal.

At the end of World War II, in August 1945, Japan surrendered to the Allies. This opportunity was used by the youth and electrical workers (through Electricity and Gas Labour/Employee delegation), which together with the chairman of the Central Indonesian National Committee (KNIP) took the initiative to meet President Sukarno and propose the take over of the company by the Government of Indonesia.

On 27 October 1945, President Sukarno formed Jawatan Listrik dan Gas (Bureau of Electricity and Gas) under the Ministry of Public Works and Energy with a power generating capacity of 157.5 MW. In 1958, L.J.N. Eindhoven & Co was nationalised and converted into PN Gas.

PGN logo before rebranding on 10 December 2021

On 1 January 1961, the Bureau of Electricity and Gas became BPU-PLN (Badan Pimpinan Umum Perusahaan Listrik Negara, General Governing Agency of the State Electric Company). The agency, which managed the electricity and gas, then dissolved on 1 January 1965. At the same time, two state-owned companies were established: Perusahaan Listrik Negara (PLN) to manage the electricity sector and Perusahaan Gas Negara (PGN) to manage the natural gas sector. PGN was officially established on 13 May 1965.

In 2018, PGN became a subsidiary of Pertamina. PGN has rebranded to become Pertamina Gas Negara on 10 December 2021.

== Pipelines ==
The company owns and operates four transmission pipelines:

- Grissik-Duri pipeline – operational since 1998, 536 km length.
- Grissik-Singapore pipeline – operational since 2003, 470 km length.
- Medan and Jakarta/Bogor pipeline – operational since 2000, 536 km length.
- South Sumatera-West Java pipeline – 1,116 km length.

In 2011 the company distributed 22.5 million cubic metres per day (795 million cubic feet per day) and transmitted 23.9 million m^{3}/d (845 million cu ft/d) at standard conditions of natural gas
