= Jakarta Stock Exchange =

Former stock exchange of Indonesia

- Native name: Bursa Efek Jakarta
- Company type: Stock exchange
- Founded: 1912; 114 years ago
- Defunct: September 2007; 18 years ago
- Fate: Merged into the Indonesia Stock Exchange with SSX
- Successor: Indonesia Stock Exchange
- Headquarters: Jakarta, Indonesia; 6°13′26″S 106°48′32″E
- Key people: Erry Firmansyah (last CEO)

Jakarta Stock Exchange (JSX; Indonesian: Bursa Efek Jakarta, BEJ) was a stock exchange based in Jakarta, Indonesia, before it merged with the Surabaya Stock Exchange to form the Indonesia Stock Exchange.

== History ==
Originally opened in 1912 under the Dutch colonial government, it was re-opened in 1977 after several closures during World War I and World War II. After being reopened in 1977, the exchange was under the management of the newly created Capital Market Supervisory Agency (Badan Pengawas Pasar Modal, or Bapepam), which answered to the Department of Finance. Trading activity and market capitalization grew alongside the development of Indonesia's financial markets and private sector – highlighted by a major bull run in 1990. On 13 July 1992, the exchange was privatised under the ownership of Jakarta Exchange Inc. As a result, the functions of Bapepam changed to become the Capital Market Supervisory Agency. On 22 March 1995, JSX launched the Jakarta Automated Trading System (JATS). In September 2007, Jakarta Stock Exchange and Surabaya Stock Exchange merged to form the Indonesian Stock Exchange by the Indonesian Minister of Finance.

== Stock indices ==
Two of the primary stock market indices used to measure and report value changes in representative stock groupings are the JSX Composite and the Jakarta Islamic Index (JII). The JII was established in 2002 to act as a benchmark in measuring market activities based on Sharia (Islamic law). Currently, there are approximately 30 corporate stocks listed on the JII. The FTSE/ASEAN Indices were launched by the five ASEAN exchanges (Singapore Exchange, Bursa Malaysia, The Stock Exchange of Thailand, Jakarta Stock Exchange, The Philippine Stock Exchange) and global index provider FTSE on 21 September 2005. The indices, covering the five ASEAN markets, are designed using international standards, free float adjusted, and based on the Industry Classification Benchmark (ICB). The indices comprise FTSE/ASEAN Benchmark Index and FTSE/ASEAN 40 tradable index. The FTSE/ASEAN 40 index is calculated on a real-time basis from 9:00 a.m. and the closing index is calculated at 6:00 p.m. (Singapore time). The FTSE/ASEAN benchmark index is calculated on end-of-day basis.

== Merger ==
Both Jakarta Stock Exchange (JSX) and the Surabaya Stock Exchange (SSX) merged to form a new entity "Indonesia Stock Exchange (Bursa Efek Indonesia).

== Terrorist attack ==
On 13 September 2000, a car bomb exploded in the basement of the building, triggering a chain of explosions in which a number of cars caught fire. Most of the dead were drivers waiting by their employer's cars. Many had taken cover in their vehicles but suffocated as billowing black smoke engulfed the basement levels.

== See also ==
- Surabaya Stock Exchange (SSX)
- Jakarta Futures Exchange (JFX)
- Indonesia Stock Exchange (IDX)
- JSX Composite
- Economy of Indonesia
- List of stock exchanges
- Telkom (Indonesia)
- LQ-45
- Matahari
