= Indonesia Stock Exchange =

Stock exchange

- Bursa Efek Indonesia
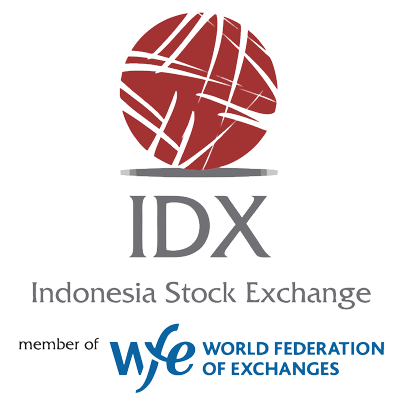

- Indonesian Stock Exchange building in Jakarta, considered one of the oldest in Asia.
- Type: Stock exchange
- Location: Kebayoran Baru, Jakarta, Indonesia
- Coordinates: 6°13′24.00″S 106°48′30.60″E
- Founded: 14 December 1912; 113 years ago
- Owner: Members, mostly securities companies
- Key people: Inarno Djajadi (president director)
- Currency: Indonesian rupiah
- No. of listings: 956 (December 2025)
- Market cap: US$1 trillion (2025)
- Indices: IDX Composite; Jakarta Islamic Index; LQ-45
- Website: idx.co.id

Indonesia Stock Exchange (IDX) (Indonesian: Bursa Efek Indonesia, BEI) is a stock exchange based in Jakarta, Indonesia. It was previously known as the Jakarta Stock Exchange (JSX) before its name changed in 2007 after merging with the Surabaya Stock Exchange (SSX). In recent years, the Indonesian Stock Exchange has seen the fastest membership growth in Asia. As of December 2025, the Indonesia Stock Exchange had 956 listed companies, and total number of investors has already grown to 19 million. Indonesia Market Capitalization accounted for 72% of its nominal GDP in 2025. Founded on 30 November 2007, it is ASEAN's largest market capitalization at nearly US$1 trillion as of 2025.

The current location of the Indonesian Stock Exchange is located in the IDX building in the Sudirman Central Business District, South Jakarta, close to Pacific Place Jakarta.

== History ==
=== Colonial Era ===
Historically, the capital market has existed long before Indonesia's independence. Since the new era of the Dutch East Indies, the government began building plantations on a large scale in the Dutch East Indies. Sources of funds for building the plantation were obtained from the Dutch and other Europeans. Stock transactions in securities trading were first recorded in 1892, which was carried out by the Plantation Company in Batavia, namely Cultuur Maatschappij Goalpara, it was written that the company sold 400 shares at a price of 500 guilders per share outstanding. Four years later, Het Centrum also released a prospectus for the sale of shares with a value of up to 105 thousand guilders with a price per share of 100 guilders.

After careful preparation, the first capital market in Indonesia was finally established in Batavia (Jakarta) on 14 December 1912, which was named Vereniging voor de Effectenhandel (Stock Exchange Association) and immediately started trading activities. The capital market at that time was established by the Dutch East Indies government for the benefit of the colonial government. The shares traded are shares or bonds of Dutch companies/plantations operating in Indonesia where the bonds issued by the provincial and municipal governments have company share certificates issued by the administrative office in the Netherlands and then the securities of other Dutch companies. The development of the capital market in Batavia is so fast that it attracted people from other cities.

The development and growth of the capital market did not go as expected, even during several periods of capital market activity experiencing a vacuum. This was caused by several factors such as the war which required the stock exchange to be closed, including in 1914-1918 the stock exchange was closed due to the occurrence of World War I. During World War II, the Stock Exchanges in Semarang and Surabaya had to be closed again in early 1939 and continued with the closing of the Stock Exchanges in Jakarta in 1942–1952. The transfer of power from the colonial government to the government of the Republic of Indonesia, and various conditions that caused the operation of the stock exchange to not run properly.

=== Post-Colonial Era ===
==== Sukarno era ====
The Jakarta Stock Exchange was re-opened by President Sukarno on 3 June 1952. Until finally the existence of the Stock Exchange was again inactive when there was a nationalization program of Dutch companies from 1956 to 1977. The purpose of this re-opening of the stock exchange was to accommodate government bonds that had been issued in 1956, the previous year. The management of the stock exchange was then handed over to the money and securities trading union consisting of 3 banks and Bank Indonesia as honorary members. The development of this stock exchange is progressing well although the securities traded are generally bonds by Dutch companies and Indonesian government bonds through the Indonesian Development Bank. Through the State Industrial Bank in 1954, 1955 and 1958 bond sales increased. The occurrence of a power dispute between the Indonesian government and the Netherlands regarding West Irian meant that all Dutch businesses were nationalized through Act No. 86 of 1958. This dispute resulted in securities from the Netherlands no longer being traded on the Jakarta Stock Exchange.

==== New Order ====
The Government of the Republic of Indonesia reactivated the capital market in 1977, the Stock Exchange was inaugurated by President Soeharto on 10 August 1977. JSE is run under Badan Pengawas Pasar Modal (Capital Market Executing Agency, BAPEPAM). The reactivation of the capital market was also marked by going public with PT Semen Cibinong as the first issuer.

However, in 1977-1987 trading on the Stock Exchange was very sluggish. The number of issuers until 1987 only reached 24 issuers. At that time, people preferred banking instruments to capital market instruments. Finally, in 1987 the Stock Exchange was deregulated by presenting the December 1987 Package (PAKDES 87) which made it easier for companies to conduct Public Offerings and foreign investors to invest in Indonesia. Stock Exchange trading activities also increased in 1988–1990 after the deregulation package in the banking and capital markets was launched. JSE's door is open to foreigners.

The Indonesian Parallel Exchange (BPI) began operating and is managed by the Money and Securities Trading Union (PPUE) in 1988 with its organization consisting of brokers and dealers. In addition, in the same year, the Government issued the December 88 Package (PAKDES 88) which made it easier for companies to go public and several other policies that were positive for capital market growth. The Surabaya Stock Exchange (BES) began operating in 1989 and is managed by a privately owned Limited Liability Company, namely the Surabaya Stock Exchange.

On 12 July 1992, which has been designated as the anniversary of the JSE, the JSE officially became a private company (privatization). BAPEPAM changed to Capital Market Supervisory Agency (formerly; Capital Market Implementing Agency). One year later on 21 December 1993, PT Pemeringkat Efek Indonesia (PEFINDO) was established. On 22 May 1995, the Jakarta Stock Exchange launched a trading automated system which was implemented using the JATS (Jakarta Automated Trading Systems) computer system. In the same year on 10 November, the Government of Indonesia issued Act Number 8 of 1995 on Capital Markets. This law came into effect in January 1996. The Indonesia Parallel Exchange was then merged with the Surabaya Stock Exchange. Then one year later, on 6 August 1996, the Indonesia Clearing and Guarantee Corporation (KPEI) was established. This was followed by the establishment of the Indonesian Central Securities Depository (KSEI) the following year, on 23 December 1997.

=== Reformation Era ===
The scripless trading system in 2000 was applied to the Indonesian capital market, and in 2002 the JSX began to apply the remote trading system. In the same year, the change of transaction from T+4 to T+3 was completed. In 2004, the Stock Exchange released stock options.

On 30 November 2007, the Surabaya Stock Exchange (BES) and the Jakarta Stock Exchange (JSX) were finally merged and changed their names to the Indonesia Stock Exchange (IDX). After the birth of the IDX, a trading suspension was enforced in 2008 and the Indonesian Stock Price Appraiser (PHEI) was formed in 2009. In addition, in 2009, the Indonesia Stock Exchange changed the old trading system (JATS) and launched a new trading system used by the Indonesian Stock Exchange. IDX until now, namely JATS-NextG. Several other bodies were also established to increase trading activities, such as the establishment of PT Indonesian Capital Market Electronic Library (ICaMEL) in August 2011. The Financial Services Authority (OJK) in January 2012, and at the end of 2012, the Securities Investor Protection Fund (SIPF), and Sharia Principles and Sharia Trading Mechanisms were also launched. IDX also made several updates, on 2 January 2013, the trading hours were updated, and the following year the Lot Size and Tick Price were adjusted again, and in 2015 TICMI merged with ICaMEL.

The Indonesia Stock Exchange also created a campaign called "Yuk Nabung Saham" aimed at all Indonesian people wanting to start investing in the capital market. IDX introduced the campaign for the first time on 12 November 2015, and this campaign is still being implemented today, and in the same year the LQ-45 Index Futures was inaugurated. In 2016, tick size and autorejection limits were adjusted again, IDX Channel was launched, and this year IDX participated in the success of the Tax Amnesty activities and inaugurated the Go Public Information Center. In 2017, IDX Incubator was inaugurated, margin relaxation and inauguration Indonesia Securities Fund. In 2018, the trading system and new data center were updated, launching T+2 Transaction Settlement (T+2 Settlement) and Adding Special Notation Information Displays on Listed Company codes.

In September 2023, Indonesia's Former President, Joko Widodo, inaugurated the Indonesia Carbon Exchange (IDXCarbon), developed and managed by the Indonesia Stock Exchange (IDX). This initiative aims to support Indonesia's Nationally Determined Contribution (NDC) targets and address the growing need for carbon trading in the country.

IDXCarbon is Indonesia's first official carbon exchange, registered with and supervised by the Financial Services Authority. Currently, the exchange facilitates trading in PTBAE-PU (allowances) and SPE-GRK (carbon offsets). As of January 2025, IDXCarbon has listed four projects under SPE-GRK, with a trading volume exceeding 1 billion tCO2e and a trading value of 55 trillion IDR.

In February 2025, it was announced that short-selling option would be available to IDX retail investors starting from later 2025.

In October 2026, IDX faced sharp decline and risking downgrade to standalone market by MSCI due to insufficient reforms implementation.

== Trading hours ==
The Indonesia Stock Exchange observes the following trading times, where all times are based on the Jakarta Automated Trading System (JATS), currently in WIB (UTC+7):

Prior to 2013, the index opened from 08.00 to 17.40, divided into the following:

- Pre-opening trade (07.30–08.00)
- 1st session (Monday–Thursday 08.30–12.30, Fridays 08.30–11.30)
- Lunch break (Monday–Thursday 12.30–13.30, Fridays 11.30–14.00)
- 2nd session (Monday–Thursday 13.30–17.00, Fridays 14.00–17.00)

In November 2012, IDX received approval from the Capital Market and Financial Institution Supervisory Agency (Bapepam-LK) for its plan to start trading 30 minutes earlier and instituting a pre- and post-closing session to avoid price manipulation.

In effect since 2 January 2013, the regular market opens from 09.00 to 17.40, and operates as follows:

- Opening session:
  - Pre-opening trade (08.45–08.55)
  - JATS processes pre-opening prices and recapitulates transactions. (08:55:01–08:59:59)
- 1st session of all trading (Monday-Thursday 09.00–12.00, Fridays 09.00–11.30)
- Lunch break (Monday-Thursday 12.00–13.30, Fridays 11.30–14.00)
- 2nd session of trading (Monday–Thursday 13.30–15.50, Fridays 14.00–15.50)
- Closing session:
  - Pre-closing trade (15.50–16.00)
  - JATS processes pre-closing prices and recapitulates transactions. (16:00:01–16:04:59)
  - Post-closing trade (16.05–16.15)

The negotiated market follows the same times as the regular market, but extends to 16:15 on all weekdays.

The trading hour was advanced 30 minutes earlier to accommodate traders from Central and Eastern Indonesia time zones that are one and two hours in advance, respectively, as JATS is based on WIB. The change is also meant to put it in line with other Asian markets, namely Singapore and Hong Kong stock exchanges.

Since the COVID-19 pandemic began in 2020, the regular market trading hours in the Indonesian Stock Exchange is open from 09:00 to 15:00, and operates as follows:

- Opening Session:
  - Pre-opening trade (08.45–08.55)
  - JATS processes pre-opening prices and recapitulates transactions. (08:55:01–08:59:59)
- 1st session of all trading (Monday–Friday 09.00–11.30)
- Lunch break (Monday–Friday 11.30–13.30)
- 2nd session of trading (Monday–Friday 13.30–14:49:59)
- Closing session:
  - Pre-closing trade (14.50–15.00)
  - JATS processes pre-closing prices and recapitulates transactions. (15:00:01–15:04:59)
  - Post-closing trade (15.05–15.15)

== Lot and tick price ==
To increase transaction volume, starting on 2 May 2016 the Indonesia Stock Exchange introduced new tick prices with a 100-shares lot as before.

- below Rp200, the tick price is Rp1
- from Rp200 to below Rp 500, the tick price is Rp2
- from Rp500 to below Rp2,000, the tick price is Rp5
- from Rp2,000 to below Rp5,000, the tick price is Rp10
- equal to or above Rp5,000, the tick price is Rp25

== Stock Indices ==
Two of the primary stock market indices used to measure and report value changes in representative stock groupings are the Jakarta Composite Index and the Jakarta Islamic Index (JII). The JII was established in 2002 to act as a benchmark in measuring market activities based on Sharia (Islamic law). Currently, there are approximately 30 corporate stocks listed on the JII. The FTSE/ASEAN Indices were launched by the five ASEAN exchanges (Singapore Exchange, Bursa Malaysia, The Stock Exchange of Thailand, Jakarta Stock Exchange, and The Philippine Stock Exchange) and global index provider FTSE on 21 September 2005.

The indices, covering the five ASEAN markets, are designed using international standards, free float adjusted, and based on the Industry Classification Benchmark (ICB). The indices comprise FTSE/ASEAN Benchmark Index and FTSE/ASEAN 40 tradable index. The FTSE/ASEAN 40 index is calculated on a real-time basis from 9:00 a.m. and the closing index is calculated at 6:00 p.m. (Singapore time). The FTSE/ASEAN benchmark index is calculated on end-of-day basis.

Besides Jakarta Composite Index and JII, IDX also has 4 more types of index, namely Individual Index, Sector Stock Price Index, LQ 45 Index, Main Board and Development Board Indices.

At 12 May 2011 Indonesia Stock Exchange officially launched a new Indonesia Sharia Stock Index (ISSI), which comprises 214 Indonesian stocks which have been screened by the Indonesian Ulama Council. Fatwa Number 80 from Indonesia Ulema Council is expected to make the public no longer have any doubt about making sharia investments in the capital market to eventually increase the number of the domestic investors in the Indonesia Stock Exchange.

=== IDX Custodian figure ===
On 7 June 2017, IDX Custodian noted that there are 1,000,289 investors based on Single Identification Number (SID) or an increase of 12 percent in less than full 6 months. At the end of 2016, there were 894,116 SID. Slightly more than 50 percent of the investors are local investors. And almost 50 percent of the investors are mutual fund investors.

== Incidents ==
=== 2000 bombing ===
On 14 September 2000, a car bomb exploded in the basement of the then-Jakarta Stock Exchange building, killing 15 people. In August 2001 an Indonesian court sentenced two members of the Indonesian special forces unit, Kopassus, Teuku Ismuhadi Jafar and Nuryadin to 20-year jail terms for masterminding the attack.

=== 2018 walkway collapse ===
On 15 January 2018, a mezzanine walkway that was hanging on the second floor of the IDX collapsed, causing at least 77 injuries. Most of the injured were university students who were visiting the building, when the incident occurred at about 12:10 WIB (UTC+7:00). Out of the 77 injuries, the 17 victims were hospitalized on RSAL Mintohardjo.

== Media ==
Indonesia Stock Exchange also operates a business news channel IDX Channel, in partnership with Indonesian media giant Media Nusantara Citra.

== See also ==
- List of ASEAN stock exchanges by market capitalization
- Economy of Indonesia
- IDX Composite
- Jakarta Stock Exchange (JSX)
- List of stock exchanges
- LQ-45
- Surabaya Stock Exchange (SSX)
