= Ciputra World Surabaya =

- Ciputra World Surabaya
- Location: Surabaya, Indonesia
- Coordinates: 7.292630°S 112.719723°E
- Address: Jl. Mayjend Sungkono 89
- Opened: 22 July 2011
- Developer: PT. Ciputra Development Tbk
- Owner: Ciputra
- Architect: DP Architects
- Num. of stores: 300+
- Floor area: 150,000 m^{2} (1,600,000 sq ft)
- Floors: 6
- Parking: 5000+
- Public transit: Trans Semanggi Suroboyo: Halte Mayjend Sungkono 2
- Website: ciputraworldsurabaya.com

Ciputra World Surabaya (Mall) is a mall in Surabaya, Indonesia. Officially opened on 22 July 2011, it is located in a super-block in Southwest Surabaya along Jalan Mayjen Sungkono. Ciputra World Surbaya was built on a 9-hectare (22-acre) site in a Central Business District area and developed by Dr. HC. Ir. Ciputra. It is currently the 14th largest building in the world based on floor area.

Ciputra World Surabaya was architecturally designed by an architecture firm based in Singapore, DP Architects, which it has also designed The Dubai Mall, Suntec City and Esplanade – Theatres on the Bay – Singapore.

This mall is located in a super-block area and is encompassed by various establishments, including a hotel, residential and office towers, like Ciputra World Surabaya Hotel, The Via and The Vue Apartments, as well as Skyloft - The Voila Apartment. Following its third phase of development, the mall now features a Multifunction Hall, Office Tower, Vieloft, The Vertu Apartment, and Sky Residence.

The Extension Mall was opened on 30 March 2021 and houses clothing-retail brand stores including IKEA, restaurants and facilities such as an Outdoor Park, Outdoor Car Parking and a Skylight Garden in the dining area on the 3rd floor, as well as a dining area that contains alfresco seatings.

== See also ==
- List of largest buildings
- List of tallest buildings in Surabaya
- List of tallest buildings in Indonesia
- Ciputra World Jakarta
- Tunjungan Plaza
- Pakuwon Mall
