= List of shopping malls in Jakarta =

Malls in Jakarta, Indonesia

The following is a list of shopping centers and malls in Jakarta, Indonesia. In 2014, The Jakarta Post reported that the city had more than 170 malls. In the aftermath of the COVID-19 pandemic, Jakarta's shopping malls have had declining footfall. As of January 2023, there were 96 shopping centers in Jakarta, including 76 shopping malls and 20 trade centers, according to the Indonesia Shopping Center Association (APPBI).

== Central Jakarta ==
- Agora Mall
- Cikini Gold Center
- Citra Xperience
- Citywalk Sudirman
- fX Sudirman
- Grand Indonesia
- Green Pramuka Square
- Harco Pasar Baru
- Harco Mangga Dua
- Harcomas Mangga Dua
- Harmonie Exchange
- ITC Cempaka Mas
- ITC Roxy Mas
- Lippo Icon Gajah Mada
- Mangga Dua Mall
- Mega Glodok Kemayoran
- Menteng Central
- Menteng Huis
- Menteng Prada
- Metro Pasar Baru
- Metro Atom Pasar Baru
- Orion Mall Mangga Dua
- Pasar Senen Jaya
- Pasar Tanah Abang
- Plaza Atrium
- Plaza Indonesia
- Plaza Kenari Mas
- Plaza Senayan
- Pusat Grosir Metro Tanah Abang
- Pusat Grosir Senen Jaya
- Ratu Plaza
- Sarinah
- Senayan City
- Senayan Park
- Senayan Trade Centre
- Thamrin City

== North Jakarta ==
- Ancol Beach City Mall
- Baywalk Pluit
- Bella Terra Lifestyle Centre
- By The Sea Shopping District PIK
- Pluit Village
- Emporium Pluit Mall
- Food Centrum
- Mal Artha Gading
- Mal Kelapa Gading
- K Mall at Menara Jakarta
- Mall of Indonesia
- Mangga Dua Square
- Metro Sunter Plaza
- WTC Mangga Dua
- ITC Mangga Dua
- Pasar Pagi Mangga Dua
- Pluit Junction
- PIK Avenue
- Koja Trade Mall
- Sports Mall Kelapa Gading
- Sunter Mall

== West Jakarta ==
- Central Park Mall
- Citywalk Gajah Mada
- Glodok Plaza
- Grand Paragon
- Green Sedayu Mall
- Harco Glodok
- Lindeteves Trade Centre
- Lippo Mall Puri
- Living Plaza Puri
- Lokasari Plaza
- Mall Ciputra
- Mall Matahari Daan Mogot
- Mall Puri Indah
- Mall Taman Anggrek
- Mall Taman Palem
- Pancoran Chinatown Point
- Plaza Pinangsia
- Pusat Grosir Asemka
- Seasons City
- Slipi Jaya Plaza

== South Jakarta ==
- ASHTA District 8
- Blok M Plaza
- Blok M Square
- Cijantung Mall
- Cilandak Town Square
- Epicentrum Walk
- Gandaria City
- ITC Fatmawati
- ITC Kuningan
- ITC Permata Hijau
- ITC Cipulir
- Kota Kasablanka
- Kalibata City Square
- Kuningan City
- Lippo Mall Kemang
- Lippo Mall Nusantara
- Lotte Shopping Avenue
- Mal Ambasador
- One Belpark
- One Satrio
- Pacific Place
- Plaza Festival
- Plaza Kalibata
- Poins Square
- Pondok Indah Mall
- Setiabudi One
- The Dharmawangsa Square
- The Park Pejaten
- ÆON Mall Tanjung Barat
- Metro Mall Cipulir

== East Jakarta ==
- ÆON Mall Jakarta Garden City
- Arion Mall
- Buaran Plaza
- Cibubur Square
- Cipinang Indah Mall
- Ciplaz Klender
- City Plaza Jatinegara (formerly Pusat Grosir Jatinegara)
- Grand Cakung
- Lippo Icon Cibubur
- Lippo Plaza Kramat Jati
- Mall @ Bassura
- MT Haryono Square
- Plaza Taman Modern
- Pulogadung Trade Centre
- Pusat Grosir Cililitan
- Rawamangun Square
- Tamini Square

== Greater Jakarta ==
=== West Java ===
==== Bekasi ====
- Grand Metropolitan Mall
- Mega Bekasi Hypermall
- Summarecon Mall Bekasi
- Metropolitan Mal
- Revo Town
- Pakuwon Mall Bekasi
- Bekasi Cyber Park
- Grand Mal Bekasi
- Transpark Mall
- BTC Square
- Green Park Mall
- Grand Galaxy Park
- Pondok Gede Plaza
- Blu Plaza
- Lagoon Avenue Bekasi
- Mall Ciputra Cibubur

==== Depok ====
- Cinere Bellevue Mall
- Cinere Mall
- Citimall Cimanggis (formerly Chimanggis Square)
- City Plaza Depok
- Depok Town Center
- Depok Town Square
- Dmall
- ITC Depok
- Living Plaza Cinere
- Margo City
- Pesona Square
- The Park Sawangan
- Trans Studio Mall Cibubur

==== Bogor ====
- Bellanova Country Mall
- Boxies 123 Mall
- Cibinong City Mall
- Cibinong Square Mall
- Jambu Dua Plaza
- Lippo Plaza Ekalokasari
- Lippo Plaza Keboen Raya
- Mall BTM Bogor
- Plaza Bogor
- Botani Square
- ÆON Mall Sentul City
- Yogya Jalan Baru Bogor
- Living World Kota Wisata Cibubur

=== Banten ===
==== Tangerang and South Tangerang ====
- ÆON Mall BSD City
- Benton Junction Lippo Village
- ITC BSD City
- BSD Junction
- Lotte Mart Bintaro
- Bintaro Xchange
- Bintaro Plaza
- Transpark Bintaro
- Eastvara
- Jakarta Premium Outlets
- Living World Alam Sutera
- Mall @ Alam Sutera
- MaxxBox Lippo Village
- Metropolis Town Square
- QBIG BSD City
- Summarecon Mal Serpong
- Supermal Karawaci
- Tangcity Mall
- Teraskota
- The Breeze BSD City
- CBD Ciledug Family Mall
- Mall WTC Matahari
- BSD Plaza

== Defunctioned shopping malls ==
- EX Plaza Indonesia
- Jatinegara X'tainment
- Serpong Plaza
- Plaza Koja

== Gallery ==
Pacific Place Jakarta

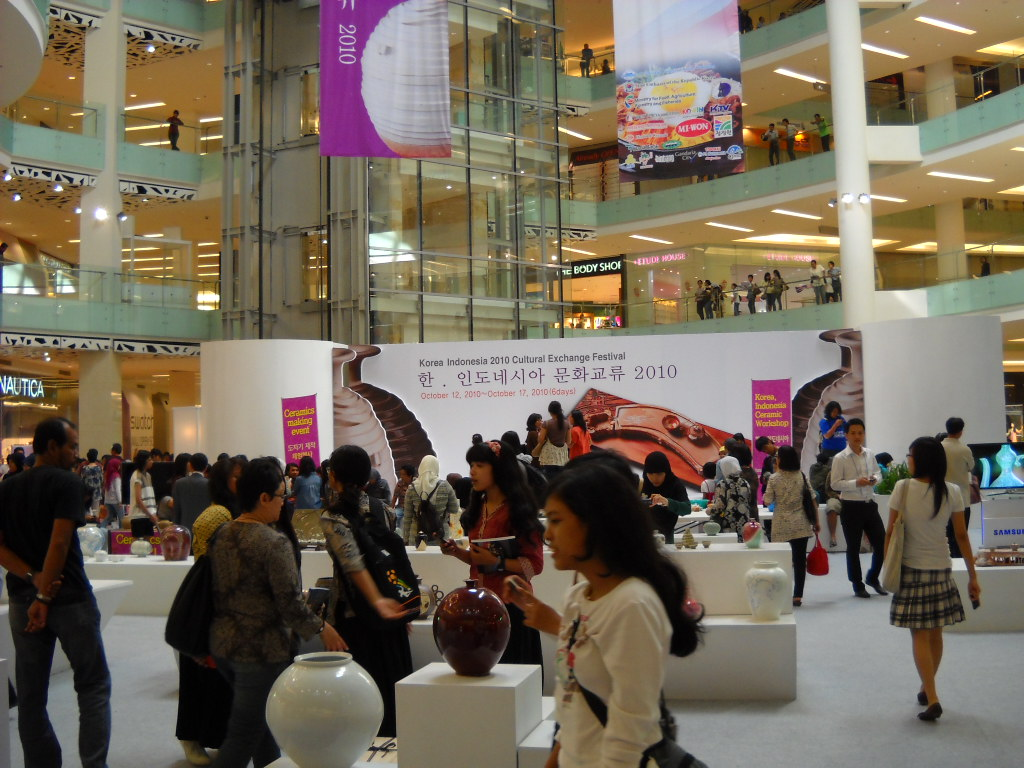
Gandaria City Mall

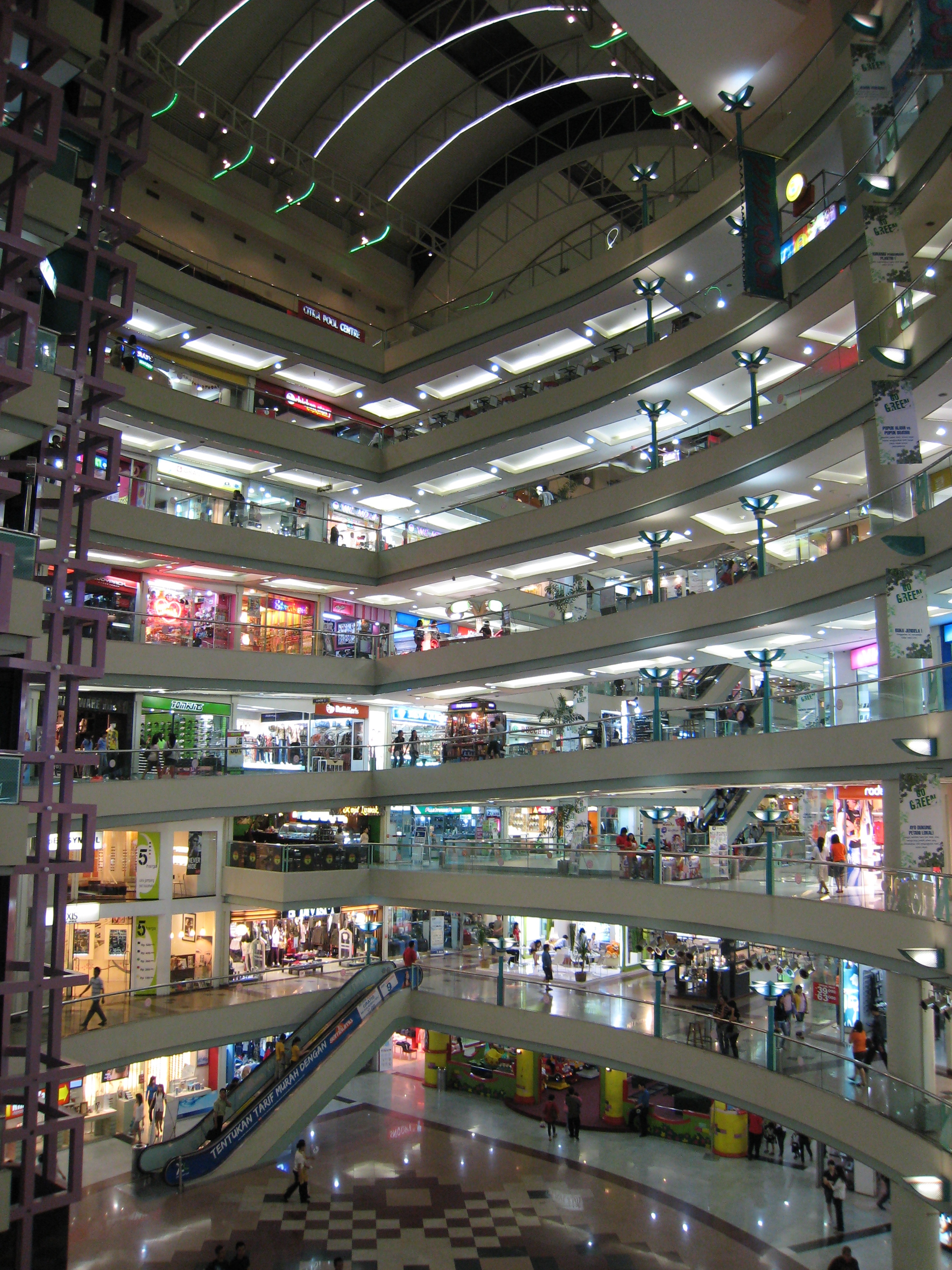
Mall Ciputra

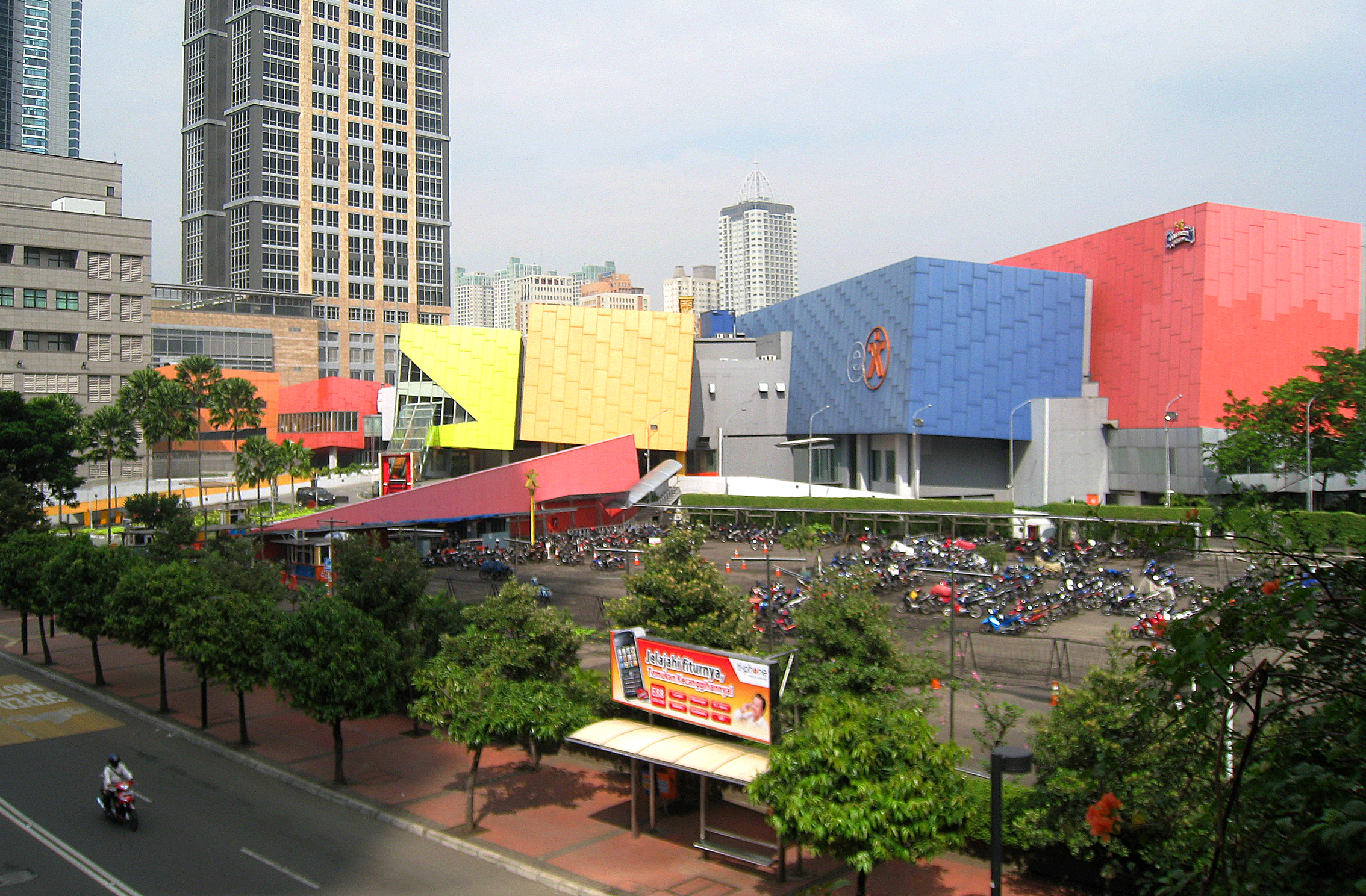
Ex Plaza, Central Jakarta

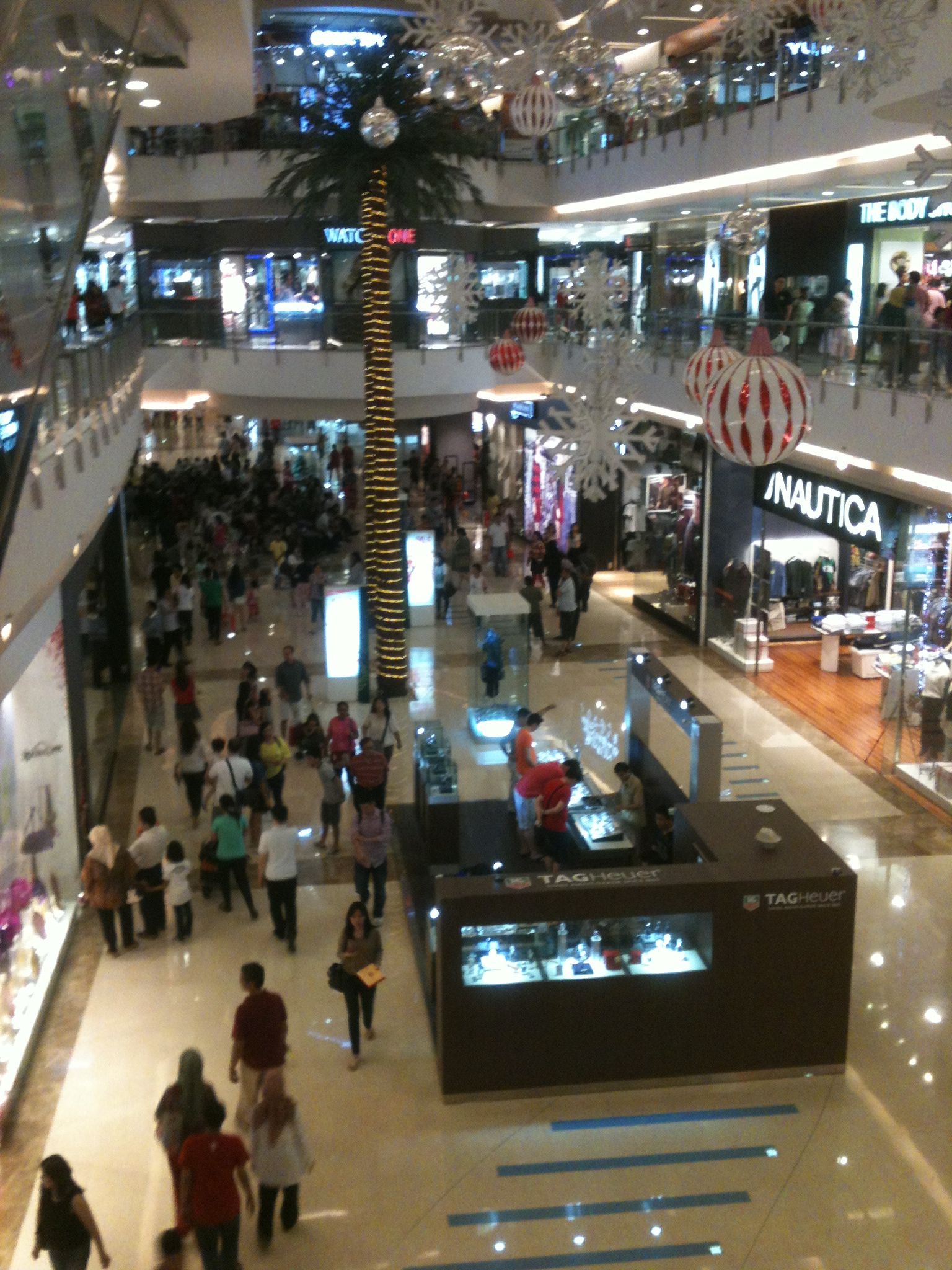
Central Park Mall, West Jakarta, Indonesia

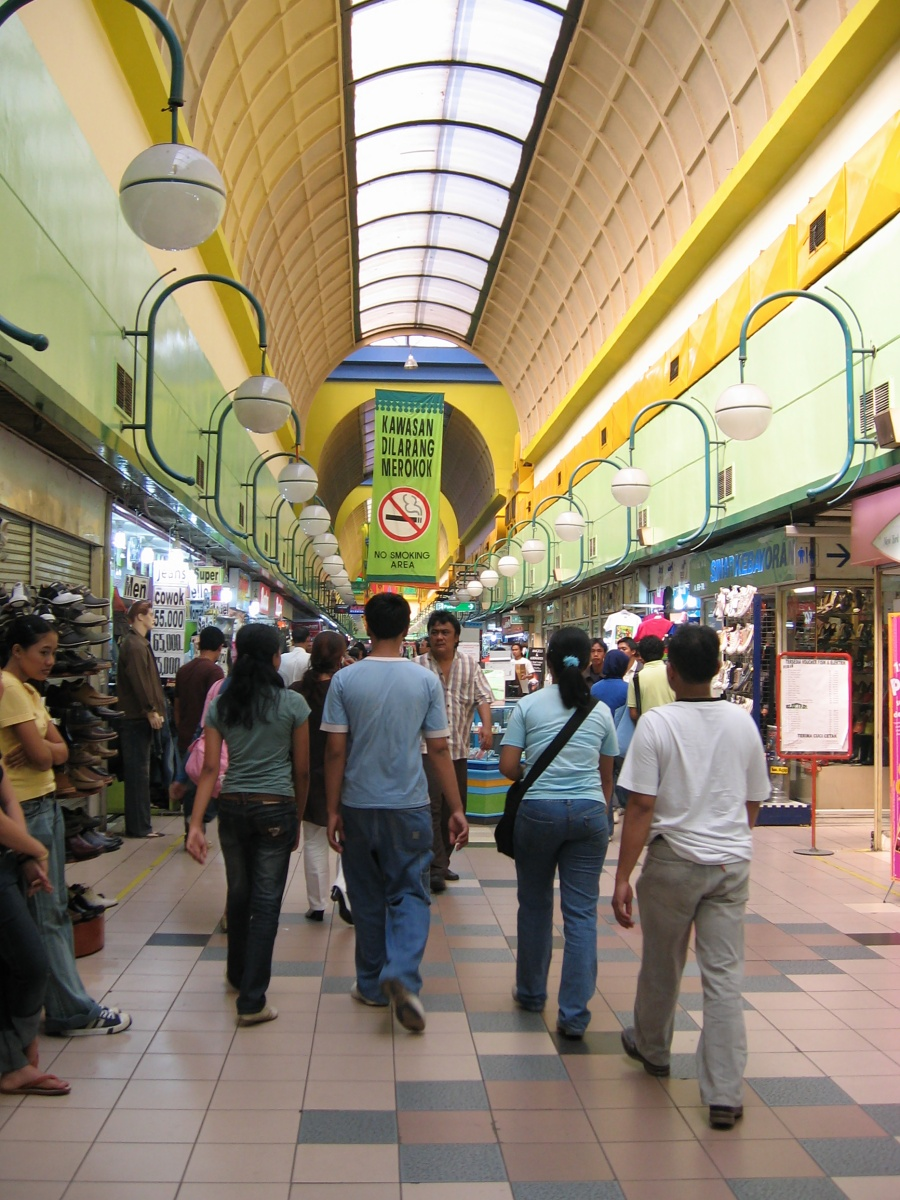
Blok M mall

== See also ==
- List of shopping malls in Indonesia
