= Pakuwon City Mall =

Coordinates: 7.2765581°S 112.8035694°E

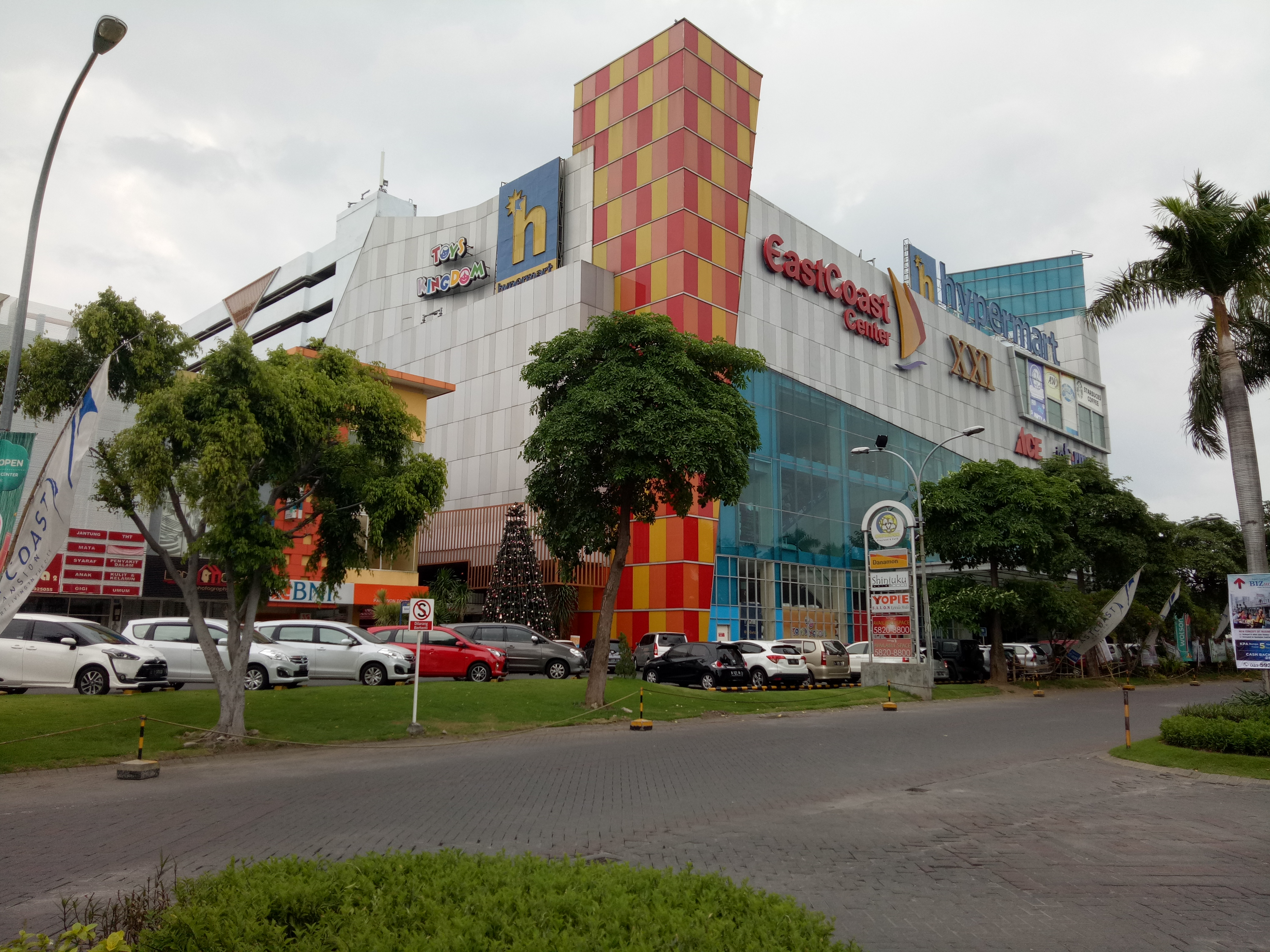
- Pakuwon City Mall Surabaya before expansion (when it was still called the East Coast Center)
- Location: Surabaya, Indonesia
- Address: Jalan Kejawan Putih Mutiara, Surabaya
- Opened: November 2010
- Developer: PT. Pakuwon Jati Tbk.
- Owner: Pakuwon Group
- Num. of anchor tenants: 4
- Floor area: 23.372 m^{2} (retail)
- Floors: 8
- Public transit: Trans Semanggi Suroboyo: Halte PCM

East Coast Center Logo (2010–2020)

Pakuwon City Mall (formerly East Coast Center) is a shopping center located in Surabaya, East Java. Total retail floor's area of the shopping mall is 23,372 m^{2} (251,570 sq ft). Pakuwon City Mall is located right in front of the entrance to the housing Pakuwon City (formerly called Laguna) precisely at Jalan Kejawan Putih Mutiara, Eastern of Surabaya. This shopping center has several notable tenants namely Hypermart, Ace Hardware, Informa, XXI.

In 2020, the East Coast Center was expanded so that it changed its name to Pakuwon City Mall which was inaugurated on November 20, 2020.
