= Kota Kasablanka =

- Location: Jakarta, Indonesia
- Coordinates: 6.223576°S 106.842685°E
- Address: Jl. Casablanca Kav. 88, Menteng Dalam, Tebet, South Jakarta
- Opened: July 28, 2012
- Developer: Pakuwon Jati
- Owner: Pakuwon Jati
- Num. of stores: 250+
- Num. of anchor tenants: 13
- Floor area: 60,000 m^{2} (650,000 sq ft) (Shopping mall)
- Floors: 32x2 (residences), 39 (office tower), 5+3 (mall),
- Public transit: KAI Commuter: Tebet station
- Website: kotakasablanka.co.id

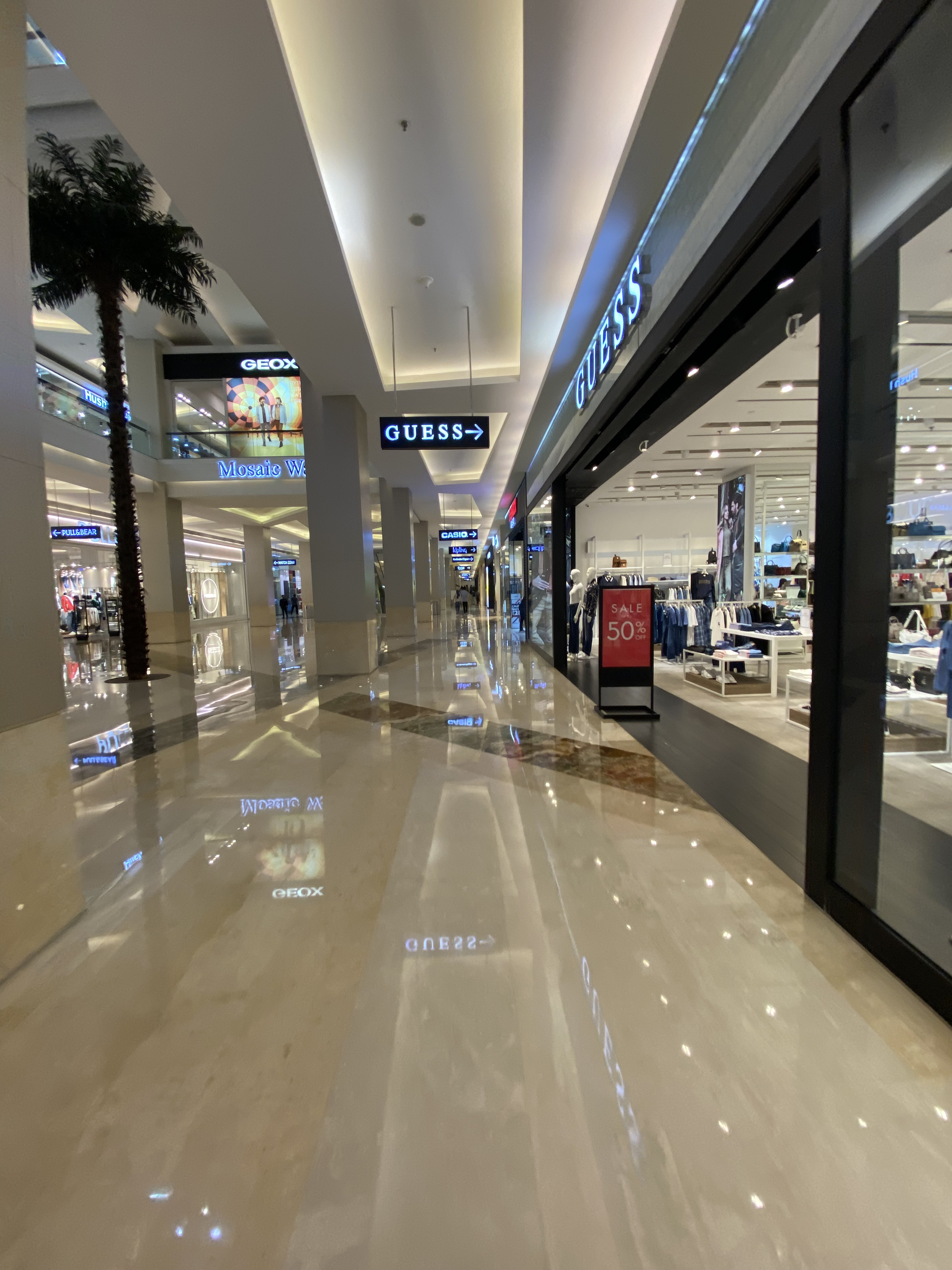
Interior

Kota Kasablanka is a mixed-development covering an area of 11.5 hectares (28 acres) at Tebet in Jakarta, Indonesia, which consists of office tower, serviced office suites, shopping center, convention hall and condominium towers. This super-block is developed by PT Pakuwon Jati Tbk (PWON).

CasaGrande Residence is the apartment block which has four towers, each has 36 floors namely Mirage, Avalon, Montreal and Montana. There are 3 condominium towers namely Angelo, Bella and Chianti. Prudential Center has serviced office suits, where as there are 2 office towers of 39 and 41 floors.

== Kota Kasablanka mall ==
The mall comprises six floors, the interior design of which is followed by mosaics motifs in the palaces of Morocco. There are 13 anchor tenants: Sogo, Transmart (formerly Carrefour, until their departure from Indonesia in 2020), XXI, Don Don Donki, Amazing Caribbean, Chipmunk, Paperclip, Celebrity Fitness, Wall Street Institute, Informa, Toys Kingdom, Electronic Solution, Eat & Eat, Azko, and hundreds of other specialty stores.

== The Kasablanka ==
The Kasablanka is a convention and exhibition center with an area of 6,200 square meters. The Kasablanka is located on the 3rd floor of Kota Kasablanka mall. The Kasablanka has brought concerts to important events, one of which is Barbie Live! Show. Barack Obama, the 44th President of the United States, delivered the keynote address to the Fourth Congress of the Indonesian Diaspora (CID-4) on 1 July 2017 at the Kasablanka Hall.

=== Concerts ===
Date	Artist	Tour	Ref.
29 March 2014	(Canada) David Foster	An Evening with David Foster & Friends	
6 June 2014	(United States) Peter Cetera	The Inspiration	
15 April 2015	(Australia) Hillsong United	No Other Name Asia Tour	
16 April 2015	(Australia) Hillsong United	No Other Name Asia Tour	
2 June 2015	(United States) Michael Bolton	An Evening with Michael Bolton	
11 September 2015	(South Korea) BTS	The Most Beautiful Moment in Life on Stage	
28 November 2015	(South Korea) Got7	Fanmeeting	
10 December 2015	(Australia) Hillsong United	Empires Tour	
8 December 2016	(United States) Boyz II Men (United States) Brian McKnight (Indonesia) Brown Sugar (Indonesia) Raisa	The 90's Soul Ace	
18 February 2017	(South Korea) Got7	Flight Log: Turbulence Fanmeet TOUR 2016–2017	
3 March 2017	(Australia) Air Supply	Southeast Asia Tour	
7 April 2017	(South Korea) So Ji-sub	Fan Meeting Twenty Tour	
29 July 2017	(South Korea) VIXX	Fanmeeting Tour	
12 March 2018	(United States) Fifth Harmony	PSA Tour	
7 April 2018	(South Korea) JBJ	Joyful Days	
10 April 2018	(Republic of Ireland) The Script	Freedom Child Tour	
20 August 2018	(United Kingdom) Clean Bandit	I Miss You Tour	
22 August 2018	(United States) Kehlani	Asia Tour	
21 September 2018	(South Korea) BtoB	Live in Jakarta	
8 December 2018	(South Korea) DAY6	Youth In Jakarta	
14 August 2019	(United Kingdom) The Vamps	Four Corners Tour	
23 August 2019	(South Korea) GFriend	GFriend 2nd Asia Tour: Go Go GFriend!	
31 August 2019	(South Korea) Pentagon	Prism World Tour	
1 October 2019	(Denmark) Lukas Graham	The Purple Tour	
21 November 2019	(United States) Why Don't We	8 Letters Tour	
27 August 2022	(South Korea) (G)I-dle	Just Me ( )I-dle World Tour	
15 October 2022	F4 Thailand Cast	Shooting Star Concert	
27 February 2024	(Japan) Ado	Wish Tour	
12 July 2024	(South Korea) D.O.	Asia Fan Concert Tour : Bloom in Jakarta	
11 April 2025	(South Korea) Kiss of Life	Kiss Road	
4 May 2025	(Japan) Flow	Anime Shibari 2024-2025	
9 August 2025	(South Korea) Lee Hyeri	Welcome to Hyeri’s Studio	
11 July 2026	(Thailand) LYKN	Dusk & Dawn World Tour	

== See also ==
- List of shopping malls in Jakarta
- Top reviewed places in ASEAN
