= Senayan Park =

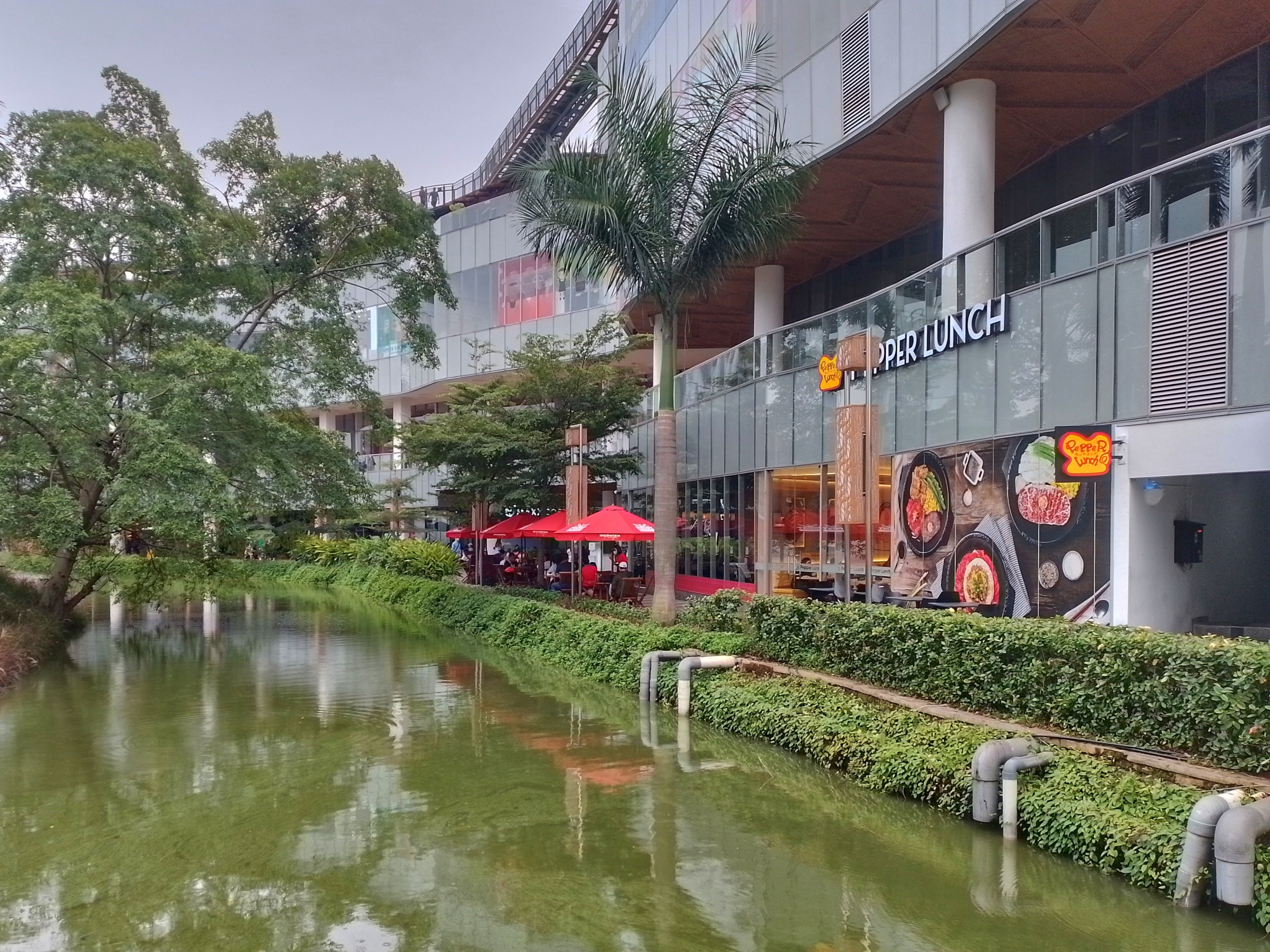
- View of the north face of the mall
- Location: Central Jakarta, Jakarta, Indonesia
- Coordinates: 6.2125624°S 106.8036355°E
- Address: Jalan Gerbang Pemuda, Gelora, Tanah Abang
- Opened: August 18, 2020
- Developer: PT. Ariobimo Laguna Perkasa
- Manager: Lippo Group
- Owner: PT. Ariobimo Laguna Perkasa
- Architect: Indra Simarta; Budiman Hendropurnomo
- Floors: 5
- Public transit: Gerbang Pemuda
- Website: https://senayanpark.com

Senayan Park (abbreviated and stylized in all caps as SPARK) is a shopping mall with an outdoor public recreational space in Jakarta, Indonesia. It is located north of the Gelora Bung Karno Sports Complex in Central Jakarta. Senayan Park is built on the former site of Taman Ria Senayan, Jakarta’s first amusement park, which existed from the early 1970s until the late 2000s.

== History ==
=== Taman Ria Remaja ===
In the early 1970s, the first lady and wife of President Suharto, Siti Hartinah, and other government officials expressed concern over the increasing number of juvenile delinquency cases in Indonesia. In response, the first lady and her organization Rukun Ibu Ampera Pembangunan (RIA) championed efforts to build a recreational outlet for families with a special emphasis on the teenage demographic. It was decided to construct an amusement park, later named Taman Ria Remaja (Teenage Amusement Park). The park was built on 11 ha (27 acres) of land north of the Senayan Sports Complex, which was then occupied by the State Secretariat. Once complete, construction costs at the time amounted to Rp 23 million.

Once inaugurated, the amusement park became a popular gathering spot for teenagers and young adults from across Jakarta thanks to affordable admission fees. The park featured an artificial lake for water rides like motorboats and water bicycles. Other attractions included a ferris wheel and spinning cups.

Taman Ria Senayan

In March of 1995, Taman Ria Remaja was renamed Taman Ria Senayan following a partnership between RIA Pembangunan and PT. Ariobimo Laguna Perkasa (ALP). Taman Ria Senayan was later reopened in 1997 after undergoing renovations.

In the mid 2000s, Taman Ria Senayan experienced a significant decrease in visitors as newer amusement parks emerged. Eventually in 2008, Taman Ria Senayan was permanently closed. The remaining abandoned buildings were demolished in 2010.

=== Redeveloped as Senayan Park ===
PT. Ariobimo Laguna Perkasa decided to redevelop the site given its strategic location and historical value. It was revealed that the site would be redeveloped into a new commercial area in the form of a shopping mall. Then speaker of the House of Representatives, Marzuki Alie, rejected the redevelopment plans as the land was still owned by the State Secretariat.

Construction of the shopping mall eventually began in 2015. The name Senayan Park was revealed later. Construction work concluded in early 2020. The mall gradually opened by mid-August of the same year.

== Recreational facilities ==
Senayan Park features several public recreational facilities. A central feature is the artificial lake, which occupies close to half of the property and displays a permanent array of floating water fountains. A promenade at ground level runs along the entire north face of the shopping mall with views of the lakefront. Above roof level, a skydeck is suspended above a large section of the shopping mall and features three observation points, a glass floor, and a 360° view of the Jakarta skyline (accessible only to visitors showing proof of purchase). Additional facilities include a large paved outdoor area for community activities and concerts named Pulau Satu (Island One) and a half-dome shaped event and exhibition venue called the Dome.

== Shops and tenants ==
Senayan Park's tenant mix consists of 70% food and beverage, 20% entertainment, and 10% others, such as kiosks. The mall's anchor tenants are Cinépolis, Timezone, Samsung Experience Store, Hyundai Motorstudio, 99 Ranch Market, Lucy in the Sky, Miniso, and Yougwa Danau Sentani.

== See also ==
- List of shopping malls in Indonesia
  - List of shopping malls in Jakarta
