= Pakuwon Jati =

Indonesian real estate developer

Coordinates: 7°15′40″S 112°44′18″E

PT Pakuwon Jati Tbk
- Company type: Public company
- Traded as: IDX: PWON
- Industry: Real estate development
- Founded: 20 September 1982; 43 years ago
- Founder: Alexander Tedja
- Headquarters: Pakuwon City Mall Surabaya, Indonesia
- Area served: Indonesia
- Key people: Alexander Tedja
- Services: Construction; Real estate development; Entertainment; Hospitality; Retail; Investments
- Revenue: ▲ Rp 6.55 trillion (2018)
- Net income: ▲ Rp 2.23 trillion (2018)
- Owner: Alexander Tedja family (68.68%)
- Number of employees: 1,349 (2016)
- Website: www.pakuwonjati.com

PT Pakuwon Jati Tbk is an Indonesian real estate developer based in Surabaya and the holding company of Pakuwon Group. Pakuwon Group was founded by Alexander Tedja in 1982. This organization centralizes on the construction of shopping centres and office buildings in Surabaya and Jakarta. Pakuwon Jati embodies the superblock concept in Indonesia, a large-scale integrated development in malls, offices, condominiums and hotels. Pakuwon owns and manages shopping centers such as Tunjungan Plaza superblocks, BBD Tower complex office, five-stars Sheraton Surabaya Hotel, Condominium and Laguna Indah real estate, as well as several industrial estates located in Surabaya metropolitan area. On August 22, 1989, Pakuwon obtained an effective statement from Bapepam-LK (now the Financial Services Authority - OJK) to conduct an initial public offering (IPO). These shares were listed on the Surabaya Stock Exchange and the Jakarta Stock Exchange on October 9, 1989.

== List real estates owned and operated by Pakuwon ==
=== Superblocks ===
- Tunjungan Plaza
- Pakuwon Mall
- Pakuwon City Mall
- Food Junction Pakuwon
- Royal Plaza
- Kota Kasablanka, Jakarta
- Gandaria City, Jakarta
- Blok M Plaza, Jakarta

=== Apartments ===
- Condominium Regency - Tunjungan Plaza 3
- The Peak Residence - Tunjungan Plaza 5
- One Icon Residence - Tunjungan Plaza 6
- Waterplace Residence - Pakuwon Mall Superblock
- Orchard & Tanglin Apartment - Pakuwon Mall Superblock
- La Riz Condominium - Pakuwon Mall Superblock
- Anderson & Benson Tower - Pakuwon Mall Superblock
- La Viz Condominium - Pakuwon Mall Superblock
- Educity - Pakuwon City

=== Skyscrapers ===
- Mandiri Tower, Surabaya
- The Peak Residence, Tunjungan superblocks
- Pakuwon Tower (Headquarters of Pakuwon Group)
