= List of tallest buildings in Surabaya =

Surabaya is the capital of East Java province and second largest city in Indonesia after Jakarta. It is also one of the oldest cities in Southeast Asia and was the largest city in Dutch East Indies. The city is home to numerous high rise buildings. The city is currently going through the stage of transforming its skylines in the process of development of high rise skyscrapers, including commercial, shopping malls, apartments, condominiums, and hotels. At present there are more than twenty completed 150m+ skyscrapers and another ten are under construction.

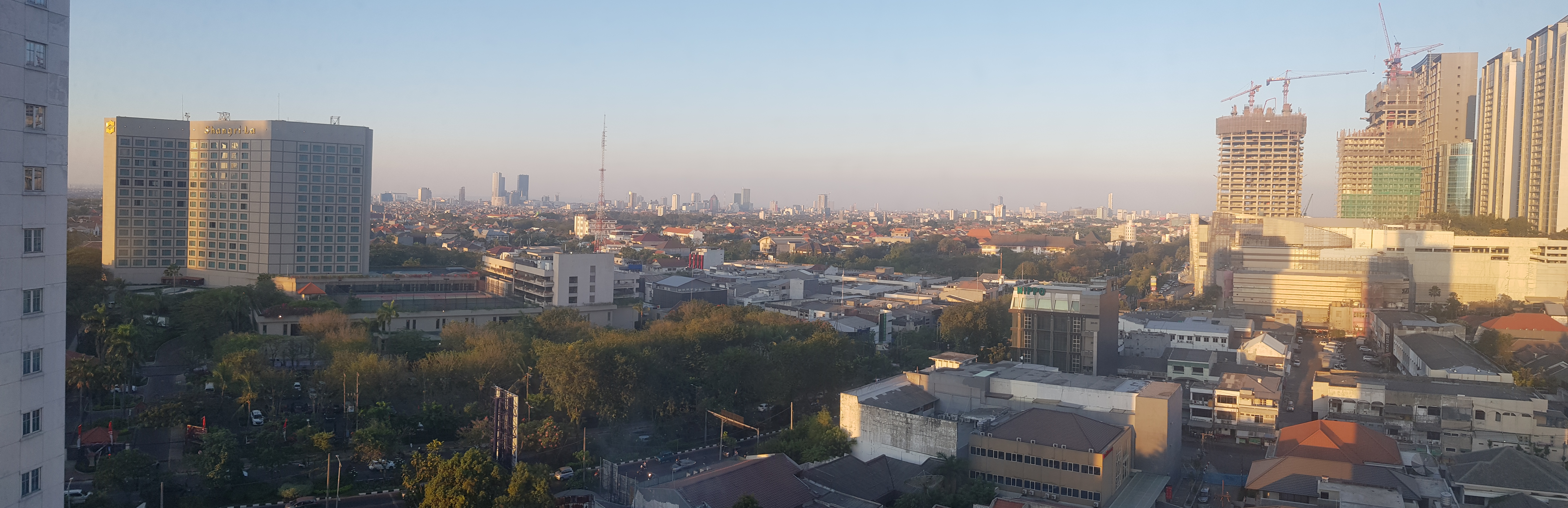
Panorama of western Surabaya in 2019

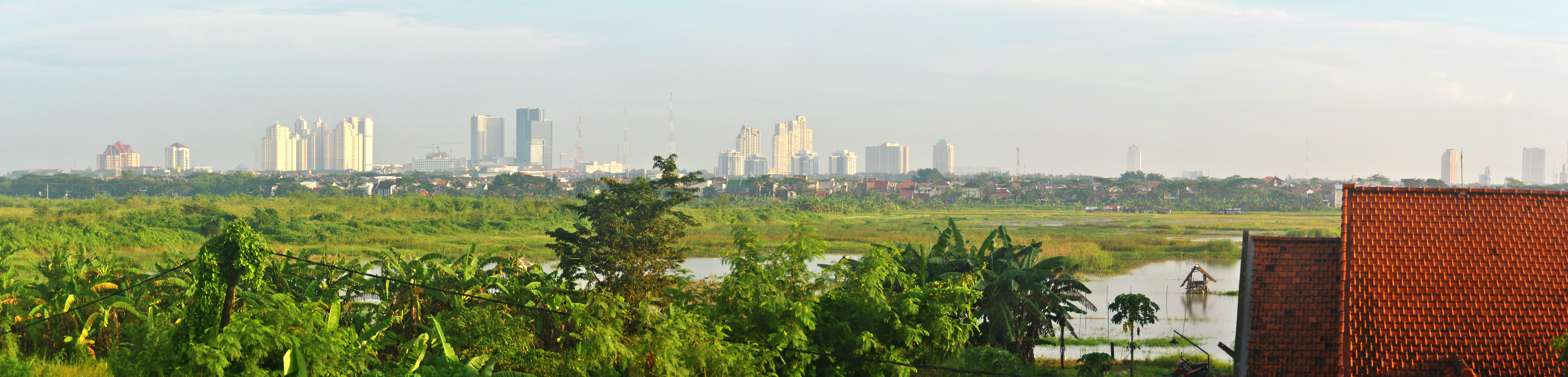
Panorama of Western Surabaya in 2017

== Tallest buildings ==
Buildings in Surabaya with minimum height of 100 meters and above, which are completed or topped out. An equal sign (=) following a rank indicates the same height between two or more buildings. The "Year" column indicates the year in which a building was completed.

Rank	Name	Image	Height m	Floors	Year	Coordinates	Notes
1	The Peak (Tunjungan Plaza 5)		201	50	2015	7°15′42″S 112°44′23″E	Tallest building in Surabaya
2	One Icon Residence (Tunjungan Plaza 6)		198	52	2017	7°15′42″S 112°44′16″E	Part of Tunjungan Plaza
3=	One Galaxy Elitz Apartment		192	50	2021		The Tallest Twin Towers in Surabaya
3=	One Galaxy Luxe Apartment		192	50	2021		The Tallest Twin Towers in Surabaya
4	Pakuwon Mall- The Ritz Mansion	Pakuwon Trade Center-The Ritz Mansion	178	50	2017		The Tallest Residential Building and Tallest Building in Western Surabaya
5	Grand Sungkono Lagoon I - Caspian		174	48	2020	7°17′27″S 112°42′23″E	
6	Pakuwon Tower		172	40	2017	7°15′40″S 112°44′18″E	Part of Tunjungan Plaza
7=	Puncak CBD		168	44	2019	7°18′34″S 112°42′15″E	Three twin tower-apartments in Western Surabaya
7=	Puncak CBD		168	44	2019	7°18′34″S 112°42′15″E	Three twin tower-apartments in Western Surabaya
7=	Puncak CBD		168	44	2019	7°18′34″S 112°42′15″E	Three twin tower-apartments in Western Surabaya
8=	The Voila 1		165	45	2017	7°17′37″S 112°43′15″E	Part of Ciputra World Surabaya
8=	The Voila 2		165	42	2017	7°17′37″S 112°43′13″E	Part of Ciputra World Surabaya
9	Ciputra Skyloft Office Tower		161	40	2018		Part of Ciputra World Surabaya
10=	Puncak Dharmahusada A		161	39	2018	7°15′29″S 112°46′49″E	Tallest buildings in Eastern Surabaya
10=	Puncak Dharmahusada B		161	39	2018	7°15′29″S 112°46′49″E	Tallest buildings in Eastern Surabaya
10=	Puncak Dharmahusada C		161	39	2018	7°15′29″S 112°46′49″E	Tallest buildings in Eastern Surabaya
11	One East Apartment		159	32	2017	7°16′48″S 112°46′53″E	
12=	The Via		150	38	2011	7°17′37″S 112°43′10″E	Part of Ciputra World Surabaya
12=	The Vue		150	38	2011	7°17′37″S 112°43′07″E	Part of Ciputra World Surabaya
13=	Pakuwon Orchard Mansion		145	48	2016	7°17′15″S 112°40′31″E	
13=	Pakuwon Tanglin Mansion		145	48	2016	7°17′20″S 112°40′35″E	
14	Marvell City Tower C		145	36	2016	7°17′21″S 112°44′47″E	
15	BESS Mansion Apartements		144	40	2022		Tallest Building in Southern Surabaya
16	Adhiwangsa Residence Tower 1		143	42	2010	7°17′07″S 112°40′55″E	Tallest building in Surabaya from 2010 until 2015
17=	Water Place Residence Tower A		141	38	2008	7°17′28″S 112°40′21″E	Tallest building in Surabaya from 2008 until 2010
17=	Water Place Residence Tower B		141	38	2008	7°17′30″S 112°40′24″E	
17=	Water Place Residence Tower C		141	35	2008	7°17′33″S 112°40′23″E	
17=	Water Place Residence Tower E		141	38	2008	7°17′34″S 112°40′20″E	
17=	Water Place Residence Tower F		141	35	2009	7°17′28″S 112°40′21″E	
17=	Water Place Residence Tower G		141	35	2009	7°17′36″S 112°40′20″E	
18=	Puncak Bukit Golf Apartement		137	34	2015	7°17′01″S 112°41′02″E	
18=	Adhiwangsa Residence Tower 2		137	34	2010	7°17′08″S 112°40′53″E	
18=	Grand Sungkono Lagoon II - Venetian		137	34	2017	7°17′27″S 112°42′23″E	
19	De Papilio Tamansari		133	33	2015	7°19′51″S 112°43′47″E	
20	The Regency		133	33	2011		
21	The Trillium Office & Residence		129	32	2011	7°15′57″S 112°44′57″E	
22	De Vasa Condotel		129	32	2016	7°17′11″S 112°41′56″E	
23	Apartemen Taman Beverly		129	32	1996	7°17′10″S 112°41′48″E	Tallest building in Surabaya from 1996 until 2008
24	Voza Tower		125	31	2019		
25	Fairfield by Marriott Surabaya		121	30	2016	7°17′21″S 112°42′39″E	
26	Educity Residence Harvard Tower		117	29	2014	7°16′20″S 112°48′29″E	
27	Educity Residence Yale Tower		117	29	2015	7°16′23″S 112°48′27″E	
29	Educity Residence Princeton Tower		117	29	2015	7°16′22″S 112°48′30″E	
30	Educity Residence Stanford Tower		117	29	2014	7°16′20″S 112°48′26″E	
31	Sheraton Surabaya Hotel & Towers		113	28	2014	7°15′46″S 112°44′17″E	
32=	Gunawangsa A		109	27	2016	7°17′23″S 112°46′08″E	
32=	Gunawangsa B		109	27	2016	7°17′24″S 112°46′08″E	
33	Hotel Wyndham (Pullman)		109	27	2011	7°16′03″S 112°44′30″E	
34	Puri Matahari Tower 1		107	30	2008	7°17′03″S 112°41′07″E	
35	JW Marriott Surabaya		105	25	1996	7°15′34.84″S 112°44′5.02″E	First of Marriott Hotels in Surabaya
37	Bumi Surabaya City Ressort (former Hyatt Regency)		103	25	1993	7°16′16″S 112°44′28″E	Tallest building in Surabaya from 1993 until 1996
38=	Somerset Tower 1		101	25		7°17′04″S 112°42′20″E	
38=	Somerset Tower 2		101	25		7°17′03″S 112°42′19″E	
39	Plaza BRI		101	23	1991	7°16′22″S 112°44′29″E	101 m (height to pinnacle), 75 m (without pinnacle) Tallest building in Surabaya from 1991 until 1993
40	Graha Pena		100	21	1997		

== List of tallest buildings under construction and proposed ==
=== Under construction ===
List of the highrise buildings in Surabaya, which are under construction and have at least 30 floors.

Rank	Name	Floors	Height m
1	Grand Shamaya I - Aubrey	50	
2=	Grand Shamaya II	50	
2=	Grand Shamaya III	50	
3	88 Avenue Mid High Apartment II	50	
4	Madison Avenue Apartment II	50	
5	Grand Sagara Apartment - Adriatic	49	
6	Klaska Residence - Azure	43	
7	Grand Dharmahusada Lagoon I - Olive	42	
8	Westown View Apartment - Sandbridge	41	
9	Westown View Apartment - La Chiva	41	
10=	East Coast Mansion - Amor	41	
10=	East Coast Mansion - Bella	41	
11=	Tamansari Emerald Tower A	55	150
11=	Tamansari Emerald Tower B	55	150
12	Puncak MERR Tower A	40	
13	Praxis Apartment Office Hotel I	40	
14	Supermall Pakuwon Anderson	40	
15	Capital Square Office Tower	39	
16	Citraland Vittorio Wiyung - Allesandro	39	
17	Capital Square Apartment A	36	
18	Capital Square Apartment B	36	
19	Citraland CBD Apartment - Denver	35	
20	Lippo Apartment & Siloam Hospital I	34	
21	The Frontage Apartment	34	
22	The Trans Icon Hotel Surabaya	34	120
23=	The Trans Icon Apartment A	33	110
23=	The Trans Icon Apartment B	33	110
24	The Frontage Office	33	
25	Taman Melati Mulyorejo Apartment	32	
26	Satoria Tower Hilton Garden Inn	31	
27	Citraland CBD Apartment - Cornell	31	
28=	My Tower Apartment I	30	
28=	My Tower Apartment II	30	
29=	Bale Hinggil Apartment III	30	
29=	Bale Hinggil Apartment IV	30	

== See also ==
- List of cities with the most skyscrapers
- List of tallest buildings in Indonesia
- List of tallest buildings in Jakarta
- List of tallest buildings in Batam
- List of tallest buildings in Medan
- Top reviewed places in ASEAN
