= List of Got7 live performances =

This is a list of live performances by Got7, a South Korean boy band formed in 2014 by J. Y. Park of JYP Entertainment.

== World tours ==
=== Fly Tour ===
Date	City	Country	Venue	Attendance
Asia
April 29, 2016	Seoul	South Korea	SK Olympic Handball Gymnasium	15,000
April 30, 2016	Seoul	South Korea	SK Olympic Handball Gymnasium	15,000
May 8, 2016	Shanghai	China	Shanghai Indoor Stadium	15,000
May 14, 2016	Osaka	Japan	Osaka International Convention Center	35,200
May 15, 2016	Osaka	Japan	Osaka International Convention Center	35,200
June 1, 2016	Tokyo	Japan	NHK Hall	35,200
June 2, 2016	Tokyo	Japan	NHK Hall	35,200
June 11, 2016	Bangkok	Thailand	Impact Arena	35,200
June 12, 2016	Bangkok	Thailand	Impact Arena	35,200
June 18, 2016	Guangzhou	China	Guangzhou Gymnasium	14,500
June 24, 2016	Singapore	Singapore	Suntec Convention & Exhibition Centre	14,500
North America
July 1, 2016	Grand Prairie	United States	Verizon Theatre	20,385
July 3, 2016	Rosemont	United States	Rosemont Theatre	20,385
July 5, 2016	New York City	United States	PlayStation Theater	20,385
July 6, 2016	New York City	United States	PlayStation Theater	20,385
July 8, 2016	Atlanta	United States	Cobb Energy Performing Arts Centre	20,385
July 10, 2016	Los Angeles	United States	The Novo by Microsoft	20,385
July 11, 2016	Los Angeles	United States	The Novo by Microsoft	20,385
Asia
July 30, 2016	Hong Kong	China	AsiaWorld–Arena	19,000
August 20, 2016	Seoul	South Korea	Korea University Hwajung Gymnasium	19,000
August 21, 2016	Seoul	South Korea	Korea University Hwajung Gymnasium	19,000
Total				104,085

=== Eyes On You World Tour ===
Date	City	Country	Venue	Attendance
Asia
May 4, 2018	Seoul	South Korea	Jamsil Indoor Stadium	18,000
May 5, 2018	Seoul	South Korea	Jamsil Indoor Stadium	18,000
May 6, 2018	Seoul	South Korea	Jamsil Indoor Stadium	18,000
May 11, 2018	Bangkok	Thailand	Impact Arena	39,000
May 12, 2018	Bangkok	Thailand	Impact Arena	39,000
May 13, 2018	Bangkok	Thailand	Impact Arena	39,000
June 2, 2018	Macau	China	Macau East Asian Games Dome	6,700
Europe
June 6, 2018	Moscow	Russia	Adrenaline Stadium	6,000
June 8, 2018	Berlin	Germany	Velodrom	7,500
June 10, 2018	Paris	France	Zénith Paris	6,500
Asia
June 16, 2018	Taipei	Taiwan	New Taipei City Exhibition Hall	7,000
June 30, 2018	Jakarta	Indonesia	Indonesia Convention Exhibition	—
North America
July 3, 2018	Toronto	Canada	Air Canada Centre	7,000
July 6, 2018	Inglewood	United States	The Forum	10,000
July 8, 2018	Houston	United States	NRG Arena	7,000
July 11, 2018	New York City	United States	Barclays Center	10,000
July 13, 2018	Mexico City	Mexico	Palacio de los Deportes	10,000
South America
July 15, 2018	Buenos Aires	Argentina	DirecTV Arena	8,000
July 17, 2018	Santiago	Chile	Movistar Arena	10,000
Asia
August 4, 2018	Singapore		Zepp@BIGBOX	—
August 24, 2018	Hong Kong	China	AsiaWorld–Expo	—
Total				175,000

=== Keep Spinning World Tour ===
Date	City	Country	Venue	Attendance
Asia
June 15, 2019	Seoul	South Korea	KSPO Dome	—
June 16, 2019	Seoul	South Korea	KSPO Dome	—
North America
June 27, 2019	Newark	United States	Prudential Center	—
June 30, 2019	Toronto	Canada	Scotiabank Arena	—
July 3, 2019	Dallas	United States	American Airlines Center	5,974
July 6, 2019	Inglewood	United States	The Forum	—
July 10, 2019	Oakland	United States	Oracle Arena	—
Latin America
July 13, 2019	Mexico City	Mexico	Palacio de los Deportes	—
July 16, 2019	Santiago	Chile	Movistar Arena	—
Oceania
August 22, 2019	Sydney	Australia	Qudos Bank Arena	—
August 25, 2019	Melbourne	Australia	Rod Laver Arena	—
Europe
October 8, 2019	Amsterdam	Netherlands	Ziggo Dome	—
October 11, 2019	London	England	Wembley Arena	—
October 13, 2019	Berlin	Germany	Mercedes-Benz Arena	—
October 16, 2019	Madrid	Spain	WiZink Center	—
October 19, 2019	Paris	France	AccorHotels Arena	—
Asia
October 26, 2019	Pasay	Philippines	SM Mall of Asia Arena	—

== Concerts ==
Date	Title	City	Country	Venue	Attendance	Ref.
April 4, 2014	Got7 1st Showcase 2014 "Impact in Japan"	Tokyo	Japan	Ryōgoku Kokugikan	10,000	
April 17, 2014	Got7 1st Showcase 2014 "Impact in Japan"	Osaka	Japan	Zepp Namba	—N/a	
October 6, 2014	Got7 1st Japan Tour 2014 "Around the World"	Osaka	Japan	Zepp Namba	—N/a	
October 7, 2014	Got7 1st Japan Tour 2014 "Around the World"	Osaka	Japan	Zepp Namba	—N/a	
October 9, 2014	Got7 1st Japan Tour 2014 "Around the World"	Fukuoka	Japan	Zepp Fukuoka	—N/a	
October 14, 2014	Got7 1st Japan Tour 2014 "Around the World"	Tokyo	Japan	Zepp DiverCity	—N/a	
October 15, 2014	Got7 1st Japan Tour 2014 "Around the World"	Tokyo	Japan	Zepp DiverCity	—N/a	
October 21, 2014	Got7 1st Japan Tour 2014 "Around the World"	Nagoya	Japan	Zepp Nagoya	—N/a	
October 22, 2014	Got7 1st Japan Tour 2014 "Around the World"	Nagoya	Japan	Zepp Nagoya	—N/a	
November 5, 2014	Got7 1st Japan Tour 2014 "Around the World"	Chiba	Japan	Makuhari Messe	—N/a	
November 6, 2014	Got7 1st Japan Tour 2014 "Around the World"	Chiba	Japan	Makuhari Messe	—N/a	
December 24, 2014	Got7 1st Japan Tour 2014 "Around the World X'mas"	Tokyo	Japan	Toyosu Pit	—N/a	
January 20, 2015	Got7 Asia Tour Showcase 2015	Taipei	Taiwan	Taipei International Convention Center	10,000	
January 24, 2015	Got7 Asia Tour Showcase 2015	Shanghai	China	Plus Space	10,000	
January 31, 2015	Got7 Asia Tour Showcase 2015	Hong Kong	China	AsiaWorld–Expo	10,000	
January 21, 2016	Japan Tour 2016 "Moriagatteyo"	Sapporo	Japan	Zepp Sapporo	—N/a	
January 28, 2016	Japan Tour 2016 "Moriagatteyo"	Osaka	Japan	Zepp Namba	—N/a	
January 29, 2016	Japan Tour 2016 "Moriagatteyo"	Osaka	Japan	Zepp Namba	—N/a	
January 30, 2016	Japan Tour 2016 "Moriagatteyo"	Osaka	Japan	Zepp Namba	—N/a	
February 4, 2016	Japan Tour 2016 "Moriagatteyo"	Tokyo	Japan	Zepp DiverCity	—N/a	
February 5, 2016	Japan Tour 2016 "Moriagatteyo"	Tokyo	Japan	Zepp DiverCity	—N/a	
February 10, 2016	Japan Tour 2016 "Moriagatteyo"	Fukuoka	Japan	Zepp Fukuoka	—N/a	
February 12, 2016	Japan Tour 2016 "Moriagatteyo"	Nagoya	Japan	Zepp Nagoya	—N/a	
February 13, 2016	Japan Tour 2016 "Moriagatteyo"	Nagoya	Japan	Zepp Nagoya	—N/a	
February 27, 2016	Japan Tour 2016 "Moriagatteyo"	Chiba	Japan	Makuhari Messe	—N/a	
February 28, 2016	Japan Tour 2016 "Moriagatteyo"	Chiba	Japan	Makuhari Messe	—N/a	
May 5, 2017	Japan Showcase Tour 2017 "Meet Me"	Osaka	Japan	Zepp Namba	2,500	
May 6, 2017	Japan Showcase Tour 2017 "Meet Me"	Osaka	Japan	Zepp Namba	—N/a	
May 11, 2017	Japan Showcase Tour 2017 "Meet Me"	Nagoya	Japan	Zepp Nagoya	—N/a	
May 12, 2017	Japan Showcase Tour 2017 "Meet Me"	Nagoya	Japan	Zepp Nagoya	—N/a	
May 13, 2017	Japan Showcase Tour 2017 "Meet Me"	Tokyo	Japan	Zepp DiverCity	—N/a	
May 14, 2017	Japan Showcase Tour 2017 "Meet Me"	Tokyo	Japan	Zepp DiverCity	—N/a	
May 19, 2017	Japan Showcase Tour 2017 "Meet Me"	Sapporo	Japan	Zepp Sapporo	—N/a	
May 21, 2017	Japan Showcase Tour 2017 "Meet Me"	Sendai	Japan	Team Smile Sendai PIT	—N/a	
May 27, 2017	Japan Showcase Tour 2017 "Meet Me"	Fukuoka	Japan	Fukuoka Sunpalace	—N/a	
June 3, 2017	Nestival 2017	Nakhon Ratchasimas	Thailand	MCC Hall The Mall Korat	28,000	
June 4, 2017	Nestival 2017	Chiang Mai	Thailand	International Convention and Exhibition Center	28,000	
June 17, 2017	Nestival 2017	Bangkok	Thailand	Impact Arena	28,000	
June 18, 2017	Nestival 2017	Bangkok	Thailand	Impact Arena	28,000	
June 20, 2017	Nestival 2017	Phuket	Thailand	Saphan Hin Stadium	28,000	
June 24, 2017	Japan Arena Special 2017 "My Swagger"	Tokyo	Japan	Yoyogi National Gymnasium	—N/a	
June 25, 2017	Japan Arena Special 2017 "My Swagger"	Tokyo	Japan	Yoyogi National Gymnasium	—N/a	
November 3, 2017	Japan Tour 2017 "Turn Up"	Sapporo	Japan	Zepp Sapporo	—N/a	
November 11, 2017	Japan Tour 2017 "Turn Up"	Fukuoka	Japan	Fukuoka Sunpalace Hall	—N/a	
November 12, 2017	Japan Tour 2017 "Turn Up"	Fukuoka	Japan	Fukuoka Sunpalace Hall	—N/a	
November 16, 2017	Japan Tour 2017 "Turn Up"	Tokyo	Japan	Zepp DiverCity	—N/a	
November 17, 2017	Japan Tour 2017 "Turn Up"	Tokyo	Japan	Zepp DiverCity	—N/a	
November 18, 2017	Japan Tour 2017 "Turn Up"	Tokyo	Japan	Zepp DiverCity	—N/a	
November 21, 2017	Japan Tour 2017 "Turn Up"	Nagoya	Japan	Zepp Nagoya	—N/a	
November 22, 2017	Japan Tour 2017 "Turn Up"	Nagoya	Japan	Zepp Nagoya	—N/a	
November 24, 2017	Japan Tour 2017 "Turn Up"	Osaka	Japan	Zepp Namba	—N/a	
November 25, 2017	Japan Tour 2017 "Turn Up"	Osaka	Japan	Zepp Namba	—N/a	
November 26, 2017	Japan Tour 2017 "Turn Up"	Osaka	Japan	Zepp Namba	—N/a	
December 21, 2017	Japan Tour 2017 "Turn Up"	Tokyo	Japan	Nippon Budokan	—N/a	
December 22, 2017	Japan Tour 2017 "Turn Up"	Tokyo	Japan	Nippon Budokan	—N/a	
May 15, 2018	Japan Fan Connecting Hall Tour 2018 "The New Era"	Fukuoka	Japan	Fukuoka Sunpalace Hall	—N/a	
May 17, 2018	Japan Fan Connecting Hall Tour 2018 "The New Era"	Osaka	Japan	Orix Theatre	—N/a	
May 18, 2018	Japan Fan Connecting Hall Tour 2018 "The New Era"	Osaka	Japan	Orix Theatre	—N/a	
May 26, 2018	Japan Fan Connecting Hall Tour 2018 "The New Era"	Hiroshima	Japan	Bunka Gakuen HBG Hall	—N/a	
May 28, 2018	Japan Fan Connecting Hall Tour 2018 "The New Era"	Nagoya	Japan	Nagoya Congress Center Century Hall	—N/a	
June 18, 2018	Japan Fan Connecting Hall Tour 2018 "The New Era"	Tokyo	Japan	Nakano Sun Plaza Hall	—N/a	
June 19, 2018	Japan Fan Connecting Hall Tour 2018 "The New Era"	Tokyo	Japan	Nakano Sun Plaza Hall	—N/a	
June 20, 2018	Japan Fan Connecting Hall Tour 2018 "The New Era"	Tokyo	Japan	Nakano Sun Plaza Hall	—N/a	
June 23, 2018	Japan Fan Connecting Hall Tour 2018 "The New Era"	Sendai	Japan	Sendai Sun Plaza Hall	—N/a	
December 18, 2018	Japan Arena Special Tour 2018-2019 "Road 2 U"	Tokyo	Japan	Nippon Budokan	—N/a	
December 19, 2018	Japan Arena Special Tour 2018-2019 "Road 2 U"	Tokyo	Japan	Nippon Budokan	—N/a	
December 21, 2018	Nestival 2018 "Winter Tale"	Bangkok	Thailand	Bangkok International Trade and Exhibition Centre	60,000	
December 22, 2018	Nestival 2018 "Winter Tale"	Bangkok	Thailand	Bangkok International Trade and Exhibition Centre	60,000	
December 23, 2018	Nestival 2018 "Winter Tale"	Bangkok	Thailand	Bangkok International Trade and Exhibition Centre	60,000	
February 2, 2019	Japan Arena Special Tour 2018-2019 "Road 2 U"	Kobe	Japan	World Memorial Hall	—N/a	
February 3, 2019	Japan Arena Special Tour 2018-2019 "Road 2 U"	Kobe	Japan	World Memorial Hall	—N/a	
July 30, 2019	Japan Tour 2019 "Our Loop"	Chiba	Japan	Makuhari Messe	—N/a	
July 31, 2019	Japan Tour 2019 "Our Loop"	Chiba	Japan	Makuhari Messe	—N/a	
August 3, 2019	Japan Tour 2019 "Our Loop"	Kobe	Japan	World Memorial Hall	—N/a	
August 4, 2019	Japan Tour 2019 "Our Loop"	Kobe	Japan	World Memorial Hall	—N/a	
August 6, 2019	Japan Tour 2019 "Our Loop"	Nagoya	Japan	Nagoya Congress Center Hall	—N/a	
August 17, 2019	Japan Tour 2019 "Our Loop"	Fukuoka	Japan	Fukuoka Sunpalace Hall	—N/a	
August 18, 2019	Japan Tour 2019 "Our Loop"	Fukuoka	Japan	Fukuoka Sunpalace Hall	—N/a	
January 31, 2025	Got7 Concert "Nestfest"	Seoul	South Korea	SK Olympic Handball Gymnasium	—N/a	
February 1, 2025	Got7 Concert "Nestfest"	Seoul	South Korea	SK Olympic Handball Gymnasium	—N/a	
February 2, 2025	Got7 Concert "Nestfest"	Seoul	South Korea	SK Olympic Handball Gymnasium	—N/a	
May 2, 2025	Got7 Concert "Nestfest"	Bangkok	Thailand	Rajamangala Stadium	85,000	
May 3, 2025	Got7 Concert "Nestfest"	Bangkok	Thailand	Rajamangala Stadium	85,000	

== Fanmeeting tours ==
Date	Title	City	Country	Venue	Attendance	Ref.
January 17, 2015	Got7 ♥︎ IGot7 1st Fanmeeting "365+"	Seoul	South Korea	Olympic Hall	—N/a	
March 14, 2015	Got7 1st Fan Party in Bangkok	Bangkok	Thailand	Impact, Muang Thong Thani	9,000	
March 15, 2015	Got7 1st Fan Party in Bangkok	Bangkok	Thailand	Impact, Muang Thong Thani	9,000	
March 21, 2015	Got7 1st Fan Meeting in KL	Kuala Lumpur	Malaysia	Quill City Mall	1,500	
April 25, 2015	Got7 1st Fan Meeting in Singapore	Singapore	Singapore	Kallang Theatre	—N/a	
May 6, 2015	Got7 1st Fan Meeting in San Francisco	San Francisco	United States	Warfield Theatre	—N/a	
May 8, 2015	Got7 1st Fan Meeting in Chicago	Chicago	United States	Riviera Theatre	—N/a	
May 10, 2015	Got7 1st Fan Meeting in Dallas	Dallas	United States	Verizon Theatre	—N/a	
June 6, 2015	Got7 1st Fan Meeting in Japan "Love Train"	Tokyo	Japan	Maihama Amphitheater	10,000	
June 7, 2015 (1st)	Got7 1st Fan Meeting in Japan "Love Train"	Tokyo	Japan	Maihama Amphitheater	10,000	
June 7, 2015 (2nd)	Got7 1st Fan Meeting in Japan "Love Train"	Tokyo	Japan	Maihama Amphitheater	10,000	
June 10, 2015	Got7 1st Fan Meeting in Japan "Love Train"	Osaka	Japan	Osaka Orix Theater	10,000	
October 31, 2015	Got7 2015 Fan Meeting in Guangzhou	Guangzhou	China	Sun Yat-sen Memorial Hall	3,000	
November 14, 2015	Got7 1st Fan Meeting in the Philippines	Quezon City	Philippines	Smart Araneta Coliseum	—N/a	
November 28, 2015	Got7 1st Fan Meeting in Indonesia	Jakarta	Indonesia	The Kasablanka Main Hall	—N/a	
December 6, 2015	Got7 Fan Meeting in Singapore 2015	Singapore	Singapore	Marina Bay Sands Convention Centre Hall E	—N/a	
December 12, 2015	Got7 2015 Fan Meeting in Shanghai	Shanghai	China	Shanghai The Hub Performance Center	—N/a	
January 16, 2016	Got7 ♥︎ IGot7 2nd Fanmeeting "Amazing Got7 World"	Seoul	South Korea	SK Olympic Handball Gymnasium	3,500	
November 11, 2016 (1st)	Got7 Flight Log: Turbulence in Vancouver 2016	Vancouver	Canada	Queen Elizabeth Theatre	—N/a	
November 11, 2016 (2nd)	Got7 Flight Log: Turbulence in Vancouver 2016	Vancouver	Canada	Queen Elizabeth Theatre	—N/a	
November 13, 2016 (1st)	Got7 Flight Log: Turbulence in Toronto 2016	Toronto	Canada	Massey Hall	—N/a	
November 13, 2016 (2nd)	Got7 Flight Log: Turbulence in Toronto 2016	Toronto	Canada	Massey Hall	—N/a	
November 19, 2016	Got7 Flight Log: Turbulence in Japan 2016	Yokohama	Japan	Pacifico Yokohama	—N/a	
November 27, 2016	Got7 Flight Log: Turbulence in Japan 2016	Osaka	Japan	Osaka International Convention Center	—N/a	
December 4, 2016	Got7 Flight Log: Turbulence in Malaysia 2016	Kuala Lumpur	Malaysia	Mega Star Arena	3,000	
December 11, 2016	Got7 Flight Log: Turbulence in Singapore 2016	Singapore	Singapore	MegaBox Convention Centre	—N/a	
December 21, 2016	Got7 Flight Log: Turbulence in Cebu 2016	Cebu City	Philippines	Pacific Grand Ballroom, Waterfront Hotel	1,000	
December 23, 2016	Got7 Flight Log: Turbulence in Manila 2016	Quezon City	Philippines	Kia Theatre, Araneta Center	—N/a	
January 6, 2017	Got7 Flight Log: Turbulence in Taipei 2017	Taipei	Taiwan	Taipei International Convention Center	—N/a	
January 15, 2017	Got7 Flight Log: Turbulence in Macau 2017	Macau	China	Studio City Event Center	—N/a	
January 21, 2017	Got7 Flight Log: Turbulence in USA 2017	Miami Beach	United States	Fillmore Miami Beach	—N/a	
January 22, 2017	Got7 Flight Log: Turbulence in USA 2017	Washington, D.C.	United States	Echostage	—N/a	
January 25, 2017	Got7 Flight Log: Turbulence in USA 2017	Rosemont	United States	Rosemont Theatre	—N/a	
January 27, 2017	Got7 Flight Log: Turbulence in USA 2017	Houston	United States	Revention Music Center	—N/a	
January 29, 2017	Got7 Flight Log: Turbulence in USA 2017	Pasadena	United States	Pasadena Civic Auditorium and Convention Center	—N/a	
February 5, 2017	Got7 ♥︎ IGot7 3rd Fanmeeting "We Under The Moonlight"	Seoul	South Korea	Jamsil Arena	—N/a	
February 18, 2017	Got7 Flight Log: Turbulence in Jakarta 2017	Jakarta	Indonesia	The Kasablanka Hall	—N/a	
April 20, 2017	Got7 Global Fan Meeting in Sydney 2017	Sydney	Australia	Luna Park, Big Top	—N/a	
April 21, 2017	Got7 Global Fan Meeting in Brisbane 2017	Brisbane	Australia	Royal International Convention Centre	1,400	
April 23, 2017	Got7 Global Fan Meeting in Melbourne 2017	Melbourne	Australia	Plenary, Melbourne Convention and Exhibition Centre	—N/a	
April 24, 2017	Got7 Global Fan Meeting in Perth 2017	Perth	Australia	Riverside Theatre, Perth Convention and Exhibition Centre	1,500	
July 1, 2017	Got7 Global Fan Meeting in Hong Kong 2017	Hong Kong	China	AsiaWorld–Arena	—N/a	
February 3, 2018	Got7 ♥︎ IGot7 4rd Fanmeeting "IGot7 Research"	Seoul	South Korea	Kyung Hee University Gymnasium	—N/a	
February 4, 2018	Got7 ♥︎ IGot7 4rd Fanmeeting "IGot7 Research"	Seoul	South Korea	Kyung Hee University Gymnasium	—N/a	
January 5, 2019	Got7 ♥︎ IGot7 5th Fanmeeting "Dreaming of Soccer King (Fly Got7)"	Seoul	South Korea	Jamsil Arena	—N/a	
January 6, 2019	Got7 ♥︎ IGot7 5th Fanmeeting "Dreaming of Soccer King (Fly Got7)"	Seoul	South Korea	Jamsil Arena	—N/a	
September 5, 2019	Got7 Fan Fest 2019 "Seven Secrets" in Bangkok	Bangkok	Thailand	Union Hall 2, Union Mall	—N/a	
September 6, 2019	Got7 Fan Fest 2019 "Seven Secrets" in Bangkok	Bangkok	Thailand	Union Hall 2, Union Mall	—N/a	
September 7, 2019	Got7 Fan Fest 2019 "Seven Secrets" in Bangkok	Bangkok	Thailand	Union Hall 2, Union Mall	—N/a	
September 8, 2019	Got7 Fan Fest 2019 "Seven Secrets" in Bangkok	Bangkok	Thailand	Union Hall 2, Union Mall	—N/a	
December 22, 2020	Got7 ♥︎ IGot7 6th Fanmeeting "Once Upon a Time: The Winter That We Loved"	Seoul	South Korea	Online event	—N/a	
May 21, 2022	Got7 2022 Fancon "Homecoming with IGot7"	Seoul	South Korea	SK Olympic Handball Gymnasium	5,000	
May 22, 2022	Got7 2022 Fancon "Homecoming with IGot7"	Seoul	South Korea	SK Olympic Handball Gymnasium	5,000	

== Joint tours and concerts ==
Date	Event	City	Country	Venue	Performed song(s)	Ref.
June 7, 2014	Dream Concert	Seul	South Korea	Seoul World Cup Stadium	Opening by JB and B1A4's Baro, "Girls Girls Girls"	
August 23, 2014	Tofu Music Festival	Bangkok	Thailand	Impact Arena	"Hello", "Follow Me", "Girls Girls Girls", "Playground", "I Like You", "A", "Good Tonight", "Forever Young", "Bounce", "A"	
September 28, 2014	Hallyu Dream Festival	Gyeongju	South Korea	Gyeongju Civic Stadium	"A", "Mirotic (Orchestra ver.)" (TVXQ)	
April 22, 2015	Kcon	Saitama	Japan	Saitama Super Arena	"My Type" (Jessi, Cheetah, Kangnam), "Girls Girls Girls", "Stop Stop It", "True Swag" (Jun. K)	
May 2, 2015	Korea Times Music Festival	Los Angeles	United States	Hollywood Bowl	"Girls Girls Girls", "Stop Stop It", "A"	
May 23, 2015	Dream Concert	Seul	South Korea	Seoul World Cup Stadium	Dance performance by Yugyeom and BTS's J-Hope, "Stop Stop It", "Girls Girls Girls"	
August 1, 2015	Kcon	Los Angeles	United States	Los Angeles Convention Center	"Just Right", "A", "Bounce" (JJ Project), "X" (Chris Brown), "Bend Ova" (Lil Jon)	
September 20, 2015	Hallyu Dream Festival	Gyeongju	South Korea	Gyeongju Civic Stadium	"Just Right", "Stop Stop It"	
October 9, 2015	One K Concert	Seul	South Korea	Seoul World Cup Stadium	"If You Do", "Just Right"	
October 11, 2015	Asia Song Festival	Pusan	South Korea	Busan Asiad Stadium	"If You Do", "Stop Stop It"	
November 22, 2015	The Nolza	Seul	South Korea	Hwajeong Gymnasium	"Forever Young", "Stop Stop It", "If You Do", "Girls Girls Girls", "Bounce" (JJ Project)	
September 24, 2016	Incheon K-pop Concert	Incheon	South Korea	Incheon Munhak Stadium	"Fly", "If You Do"	
March 4, 2017	One K Global Peace Concert	Manila	Philippines	Mall of Asia Arena		
May 20, 2017	Kcon	Chiba	Japan	Makuhari Messe	Intro+"Never Ever"	
August 20, 2017	Kcon	Los Angeles	United States	Staples Center	Intro+"Never Ever", "Everyday", "Hard Carry"	
October 14, 2017	KBS Friendship Super Show	Ansan	South Korea	Ansan Lake Park Central Plaza	"You Are", "If You Do"	
September 30, 2018	Kcon	Bangkok	Thailand	Impact Arena	"King", "Think About It", "Phoenix", "Lullaby", "Never Ever", "Look", "Hard Carry"	
September 28, 2019	Kcon	Bangkok	Thailand	Impact Arena	"Eclipse", "Just Right", "Miracle", "Hard Carry"	

== Award and television shows ==
Date	Event	City	Country	Venue	Performed song(s)	Ref.
December 21, 2014	SBS Gayo Daejeon	Seoul	South Korea	COEX	"Stop Stop It", "Girls Girls Girls", "Moves like Jagger" (Maroon 5)	
December 31, 2014	MBC Gayo Daejejeon	Seoul	South Korea	Sangam MBC Building	"Stress Come On!" (Big Byung), "Stop Stop It", "A"	
January 15, 2015	Golden Disc Awards	Beijing	China	MasterCard Center	"Stop Stop It", "A", "Girls Girls Girls"	
January 22, 2015	Seoul Music Awards	Seoul	South Korea	Olympic Gymnastics Arena	Intro+"Stop Stop It"	
December 2, 2015	Mnet Asian Music Awards	Hong Kong	China	AsiaWorld–Arena	"Girls Girls Girls", dance performance with BTS, "If You Do"	
December 27, 2015	SBS Gayo Daejeon	Seoul	South Korea	COEX	Dance performance with VIXX, B.A.P and IKon, "If You Do"	
December 30, 2015	KBS Gayo Daechukje	Seoul	South Korea	Gocheok Sky Dome	"As Much Love As All There Is" (세상에 뿌려진 사랑만큼), "If You Do", dance performance with Vixx and BTS	
December 31, 2015	MBC Gayo Daejejeon	Goyang	South Korea	MBC Dream Center Studio 6	"You In Vague Memory" (흐린 기억 속의 그대) (Hyun Jin-young), "If You Do"	
December 2, 2016	Mnet Asian Music Awards	Hong Kong	China	AsiaWorld–Arena	Dance performance with Monsta X's Jooheon, "Hard Carry"	
December 26, 2016	SBS Gayo Daejeon	Seoul	South Korea	COEX	"24K Magic" (Bruno Mars) and "In the Name of Love" (Martin Garrix and Bebe Rexha), "Fly", "Hard Carry", "It's Raining" (Rain), "Don't Leave Me" (J.Y. Park), "Who's Your Mama?" (J.Y. Park)	
December 29, 2016	KBS Gayo Daechukje	Seoul	South Korea	KBS Hall	"One Candle" (g.o.d.), "Hard Carry", "Bad Girl Good Girl" (Miss A), "A Flying Butterfly" (Yoon Do-hyun Band), "Don't Worry My Dear" (Jeon In-kwon)	
December 31, 2016	MBC Gayo Daejejeon	Goyang	South Korea	MBC Dream Center Public Hall	"Hard Carry"	
January 7, 2017	2016 Zing Music Awards	Ho Chi Minh	Vietnam	Phu Tho Stadium	"Hard Carry", "Fly", "Stop Stop It", "If You Do", "Girls Girls Girls"	
January 14, 2017	Golden Disc Awards	Goyang	South Korea	KINTEX	"Can't Let You Go Even If I Die" (2AM), "Fly", "Hard Carry"	
January 19, 2017	Seoul Music Awards	Seoul	South Korea	Jamsil Arena	Intro+"Hard Carry"	
February 2, 2017	Gaon Chart Music Awards	Seoul	South Korea	Jamsil Arena	"Fly (Remix)", "Hard Carry"	
December 1, 2017	Mnet Asian Music Awards	Hong Kong	China	AsiaWorld–Arena	"1/n (2017 MAMA Remix Ver.)", "You Are", "Never Ever (Rock Ver.)"	
December 25, 2017	SBS Gayo Daejeon	Seoul	South Korea	Gocheok Sky Dome	"Hey, Come On 2017" (Shinhwa), "You Are"	
December 31, 2017	MBC Gayo Daejejeon	Goyang	South Korea	MBC Dream Center Public Hall	"Entertainer" (Psy), "Teenager", "To You" (Shin Hae-chul)	
January 11, 2018	Golden Disc Awards	Goyang	South Korea	KINTEX	"You Whom I Love" (4men), "Teenager", "Never Ever"	
January 25, 2018	Seoul Music Awards	Seoul	South Korea	Gocheok Sky Dome	Intro+"Never Ever", "You Are"	
February 14, 2018	Gaon Chart Music Awards	Seoul	South Korea	Jamsil Arena	"Intro+You Are", "Never Ever"	
November 28, 2018	Asia Artist Awards	Incheon	South Korea	Namdong Gymnasium	"Lullaby", "Look"	
December 12, 2018	Mnet Asian Music Awards	Saitama	Japan	Saitama Super Arena	"Fantastic Baby" (BigBang), "Bounce (Dubstep Ver.)" (Cho Yong-pil)	
December 14, 2018	Mnet Asian Music Awards	Hong Kong	China	AsiaWorld–Arena	"Lullaby (Ballad Ver.)", "Fine (Remix)", "Nightmare", "Lullaby (Dark Ver.)"	
December 25, 2018	SBS Gayo Daejeon	Seoul	South Korea	Gocheok Sky Dome	"Look", "Lullaby", "Don't Stop Me Now" (Queen)	
December 28, 2018	KBS Gayo Daechukje	Seoul	South Korea	KBS Hall	"You Are So Beautiful" (Eddy Kim), "Lies" (g.o.d.), "J (Jackpot)", "Y (Youth)", "Don't Leave Me" (J.Y. Park), "Miracle", "Lullaby"	
December 31, 2018	MBC Gayo Daejejeon	Goyang	South Korea	MBC Dream Center Public Hall	"Intro+Look"	
January 6, 2019	Golden Disc Awards	Seoul	South Korea	Gocheok Sky Dome	"Miracle", "From Now", "Look"	
November 16, 2019	V Live Awards	Seoul	South Korea	Gocheok Sky Dome	"Intro", "You Calling My Name", "Crash & Burn"	
November 26, 2019	Asia Artist Awards	Hanoi	Vietnam	My Dinh National Stadium	"You Calling My Name", "Crash & Burn", "Hard Carry"	
December 4, 2019	Mnet Asian Music Awards	Nagoya	Japan	Nagoya Dome	"Intro+Eclipse (2019 MAMA ver.)", "You Calling My Name", "Crash & Burn"	
December 25, 2019	SBS Gayo Daejeon	Seoul	South Korea	Gocheok Sky Dome	"Eclipse (Remix)", "Page", "Done For Me"	
December 27, 2019	KBS Gayo Daechukje	Goyang	South Korea	KINTEX	"Dandelion", "Hip Song" (Rain), "Stop Stop It (Remix Ver.)", "You Calling My Name", "The Earth Traveler"	
December 31, 2019	MBC Gayo Daejejeon	Goyang	South Korea	MBC Dream Center Public Hall	"Just a Feeling" (S.E.S.), "Come On", "Thursday"	
January 5, 2020	Golden Disc Awards	Seoul	South Korea	Gocheok Sky Dome	"Intro", "Eclipse", "You Calling My Name"	
November 28, 2020	Asia Artist Awards	Seoul	South Korea	—N/a	"Aura", "Not By The Moon"	
December 20, 2020	Mnet Asian Music Awards	Paju	South Korea	CJ ENM Content World	"Not By The Moon (MAMA ver.)", "Last Piece"	
December 12, 2020	The Fact Music Awards	Incheon	South Korea	Paradise City Studio	"Not By The Moon", "Last Piece"	
December 18, 2020	KBS Gayo Daechukje	Seoul	South Korea	KBS Hall	"Nunu Nana" (Jessi), "Out", "Last Piece"	
December 25, 2020	SBS Gayo Daejeon	Daegu	South Korea	—N/a	"Things We Took For Granted" (Lee Juck), "Just Right", "Poison", "Breath"	
December 31, 2020	MBC Gayo Daejejeon	Ilsan	South Korea	MBC Dream Center	"Intro"+"Last Piece"	
January 10, 2021	Golden Disc Awards	Goyang	South Korea	KINTEX	"Intro"+"Not By The Moon", "Breath"	
