= Royal Plaza (Surabaya) =

Coordinates: 7.3091953°S 112.7344606°E

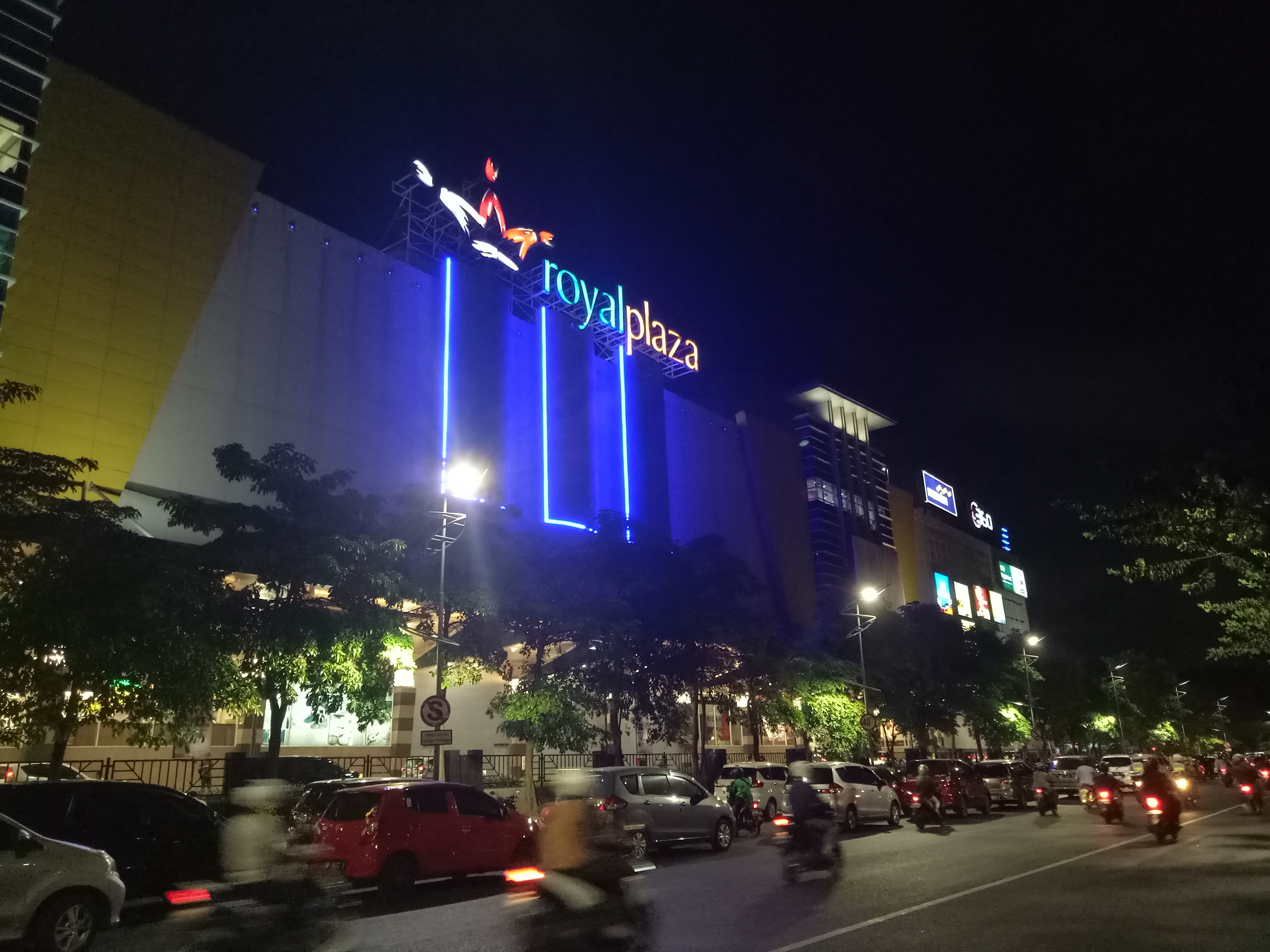
- Location: Surabaya, Indonesia
- Opened: 7 October 2006
- Developer: PT. Pakuwon Jati Tbk.
- Owner: Pakuwon Group
- Floors: 4
- Public transit: Wonokromo

Royal Plaza is a shopping center located in Surabaya, East Java. The shopping mall was founded on October 7, 2006. The mall consists of 4 floors with notable tenants namely Matahari Dept. Store, ACE Hardware, Hypermart, KFC, Pizza Hut, Cinema XXI, etc.
