= Gandaria City =

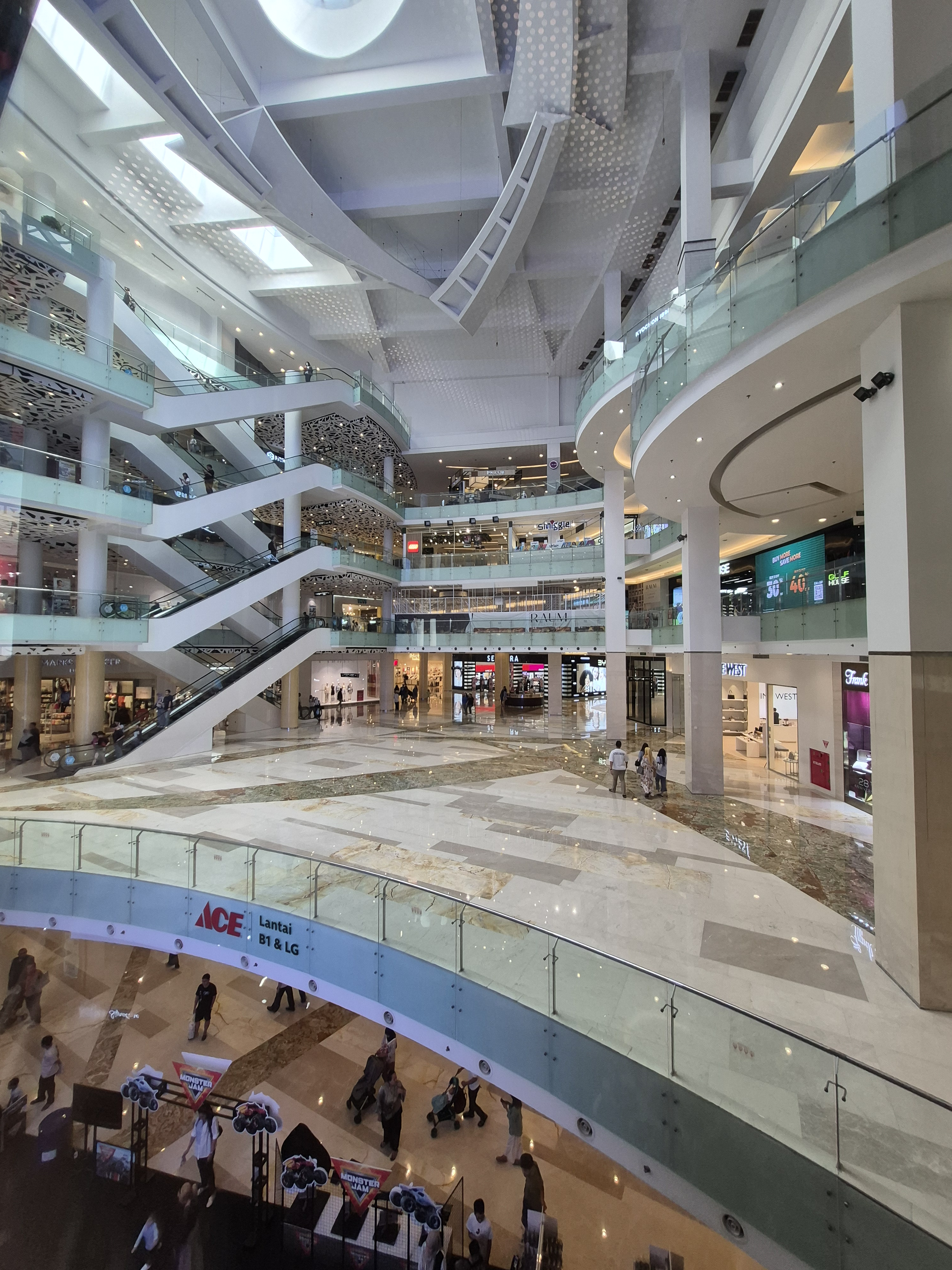
- Inner view, 2024
- Location: Jakarta, Indonesia
- Coordinates: 6.245237°S 106.783602°E
- Address: Jalan Sultan Iskandar Muda No.8, North Kebayoran Lama, Kebayoran Lama, South Jakarta
- Opened: August 5, 2010; 16 years ago
- Developer: Pakuwon Jati
- Owner: Pakuwon Jati
- Num. of stores: 350+
- Num. of anchor tenants: 12
- Floor area: 650,000 m^{2} (7,000,000 sq ft) (The complex); 336,279 m^{2} (3,619,680 sq ft) (shopping mall)
- Floors: 34x2 (residences), 32 (office tower), 5+3 (mall), 12 (hotel)
- Public transit: Kebayoran; Velbak Kebayoran
- Website: gandariacity.co.id

Gandaria City, abbreviated as GanCy, is a mixed-use complex including a shopping mall, an office tower, apartment towers, and a hotel at Kebayoran Lama, Jakarta, Indonesia developed by Pakuwon Jati. The shopping mall, Sheraton Grand Gandaria City hotel, apartment towers and office tower are all directly connected. The development has a land area of about 8.5 hectares.

== Gandaria City Mall ==
The mall consists of 3 Basement Parking Floors, 5 Shopping Center Floors, and 1 Floor for Skenoo Hall. The main tenants of this mall are: Metro, Lotte Mart, Uniqlo, H&M, Mango, Daiso, Informa home furnishing, Azko, Eat & Eat foodcourt, Cinema XXI, Electronic Solution, Celebrity Fitness, Amazone entertainment center, Gramedia bookstore, Paperclip stationery store and Toys Kingdom. There are more than 400 other stores in the mall. A convention center with an area of 6,200 square meters also located within the mall.

== Gandaria Mainstreet And Skenoo Hall ==
Gandaria Mainstreet, within Gandaria City, runs 600 on two levels, with indoor and outdoor sections. It includes restaurants, bistros, lounges, cafes, dessert shops, and entertainment, making it attractive to families and young people. Designed by Genius Loci, am interior design firm with offices in Singapore, Shanghai and Jakarta, the Main Street thematic concept reflects the architectural features of Batavia (Old Town) at one end and New York Times Square on the other. The neighborhood on Main Street is further enhanced by Piazza, an outdoor stage and a landscaped architecture park that serves as a venue for events and shows.

Skenoo Hall is a convention and exhibition center with an area of 6,200 square meters. The 2,500-seat auditorium is located on the 3rd floor of Gandaria City Mall and has brought pop concerts and family shows to important events. Examples Disney Live, Mister Maker Comes to town, and a concert by Cuban-American rapper Pitbull with the theme of Global Warming.

== See also ==
- List of shopping malls in Jakarta
- List of largest shopping malls in the world
