= Mangga Dua, Jakarta =

Place in Indonesia

Coordinates: 6.13688°S 106.83220°E

Mangga Dua is a shopping district at Pademangan subdistrict of North Jakarta, in Indonesia. The area is bordered by Jalan Gajah Mada in the west and Jalan Gunung Sahari in the east, while in the middle is Jalan Pangeran Jayakarta and Jalan Mangga Dua Raya. Mangga Dua is part of Jakarta's long history starting from Sunda Kelapa port and Glodok, which is biggest China town in Indonesia. The area is one of the 12 coastal tourism spots to attract foreign tourists by Dinas Pariwisata dan Kebudayaan (Department of Tourism and Culture). Mangga Dua and the contiguous Glodok are one of the biggest shopping areas in southeast Asia.

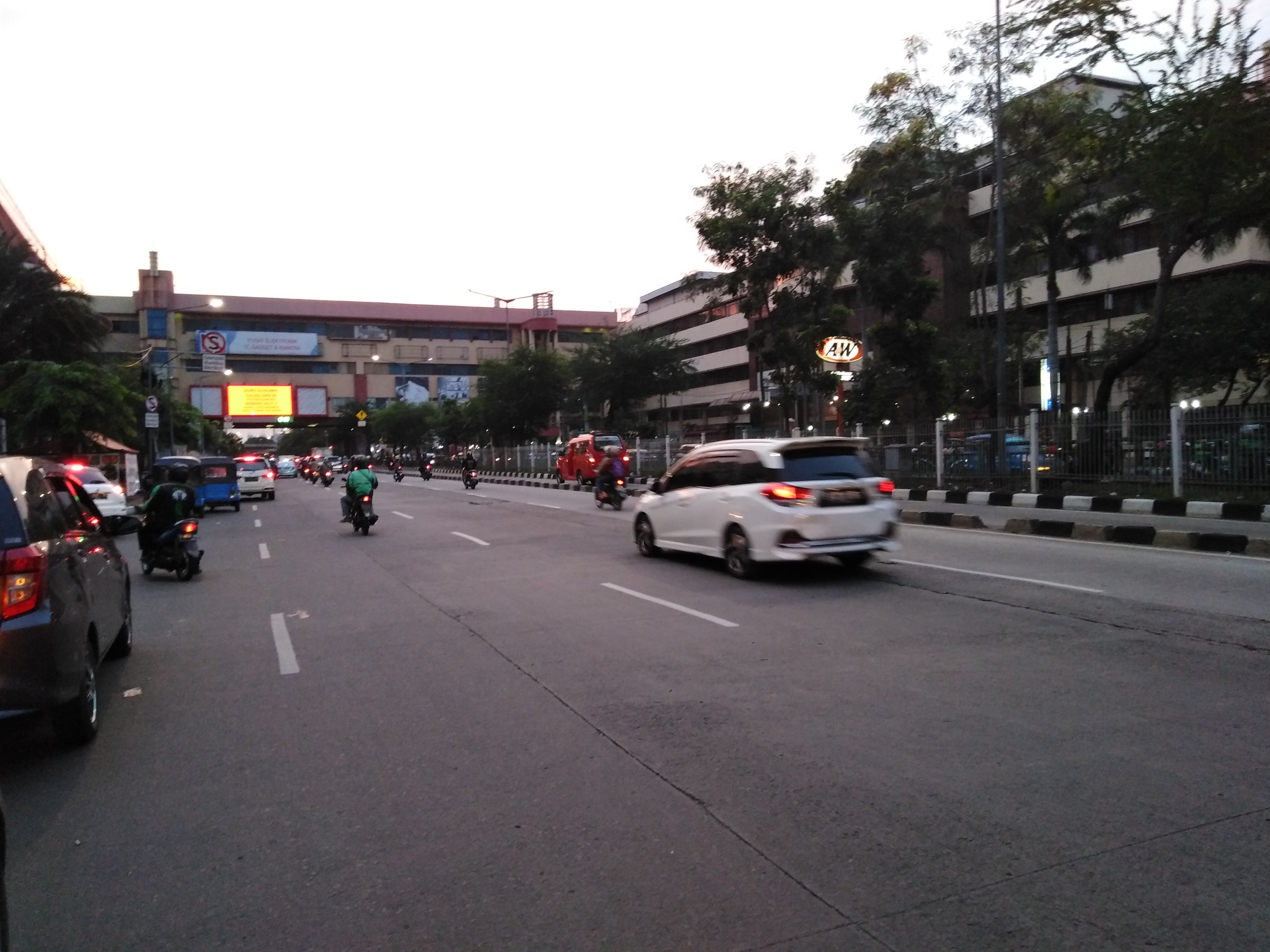
Main avenue of Mangga Dua

== Etymology ==
Mangga means mango in Indonesian language. It is believed that there were plenty of mango as well as other fruit trees in the area. Formerly a Kampung Mangga Dua was originally inhabited around the 18th century. Then gradually the area became a settlement of immigrants. During colonial period the area was mainly inhabited by those, who had affairs with the VOC and the Dutch East Indies government.

== Shopping Centers ==
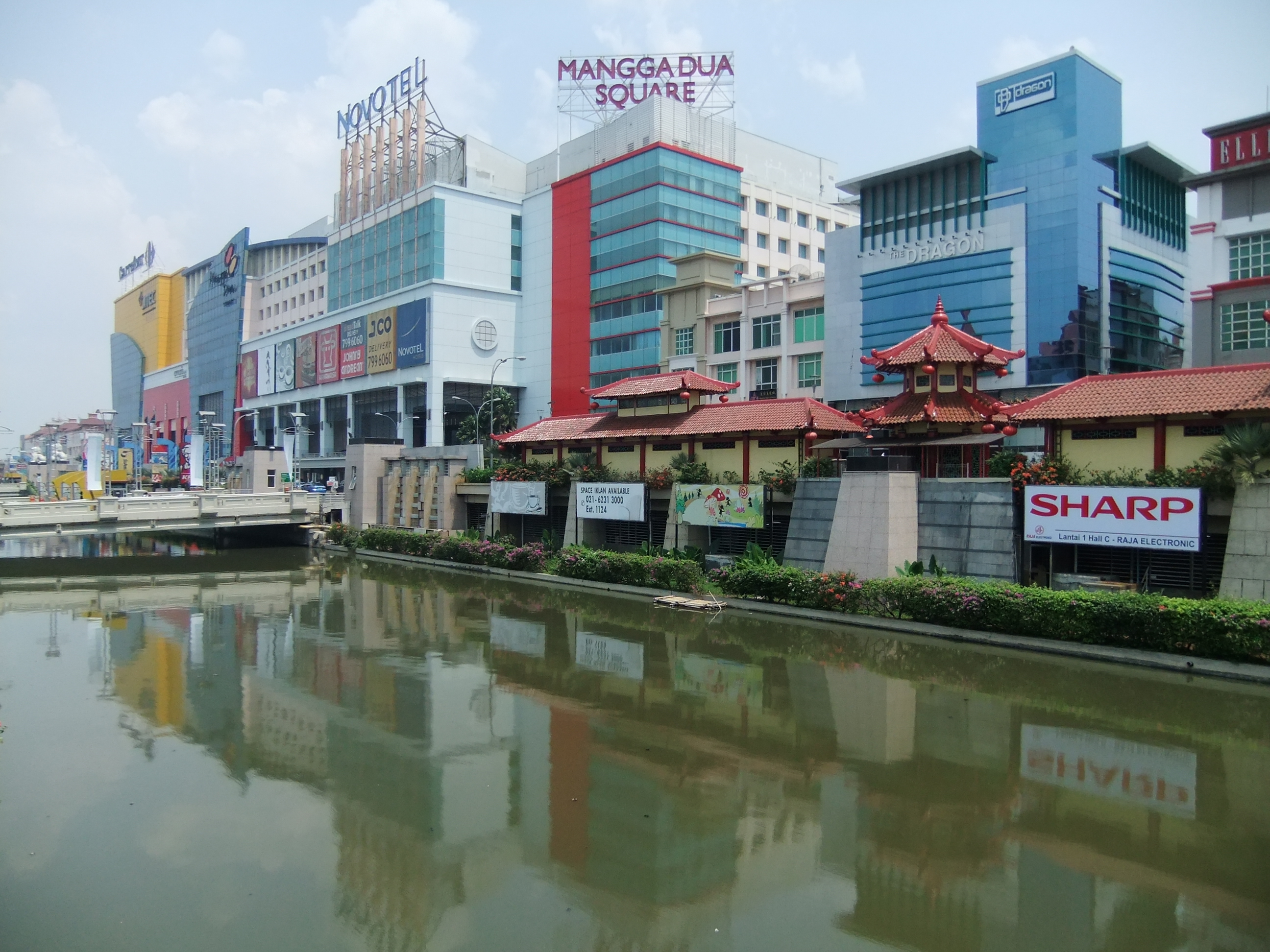
Mangga Dua Square shopping mall

Mangga Dua has also been the favorite shopping destination for foreign and local tourists, especially those from outside Java. The shopping centers are located mostly at Jalan Mangga Dua Raya.

- Mangga Dua Square was opened on June 18, 2005, by the Governor of Jakarta, Sutiyoso. Located at the intersection of Jalan Mangga Dua and Jalan Gunung Sahari, Mangga Dua Square complex also has multi function hall known as JITEC (Jakarta Int’l Event & Convention Center). Some big events were held here, such as concerts of American singer Beyonce, Asian International Stamp, and Greyson chance Exhibition.
- WTC Mangga Dua has been long known as the center of automotive products providing new and used cars. Due to this, WTC Mangga Dua is also known as bursa otomotif or ‘automotive exchange’.
- Harco Mangga Dua is computer and electronic shopping center. The establishment provides many kinds of computer accessories, electronics, household appliances such as refrigerators, televisions, sound systems, air conditioners, as well as computer peripherals like USB flash drives, mice and keyboards are available here.
- ITC Mangga Dua is a shopping center for various kinds of fashion and home textiles products in affordable prices. There is a skybridge connecting this location to Mangga Dua Mall.
- Mangga Dua Mall is a shopping center for computer components, desktop computers, laptops, netbooks of various brands and prices. Not only computers are here, however, as you can also find computer accessories, cameras, even sound systems. Electronics and gadgets such as cellphones, massage devices, and kitchen equipment are also available.
- Harcomas Mangga Dua is also a computer and accessories market but spare parts and electronics repair shops make this place well known.
- Pasar Pagi Mangga Dua is a shopping center for ready-to-wear clothes, bed covers, tablecloths, and curtains. There are many shops for wedding supplies such as souvenirs.
- Orion Mall Mangga Dua is a market for computer and accessories.

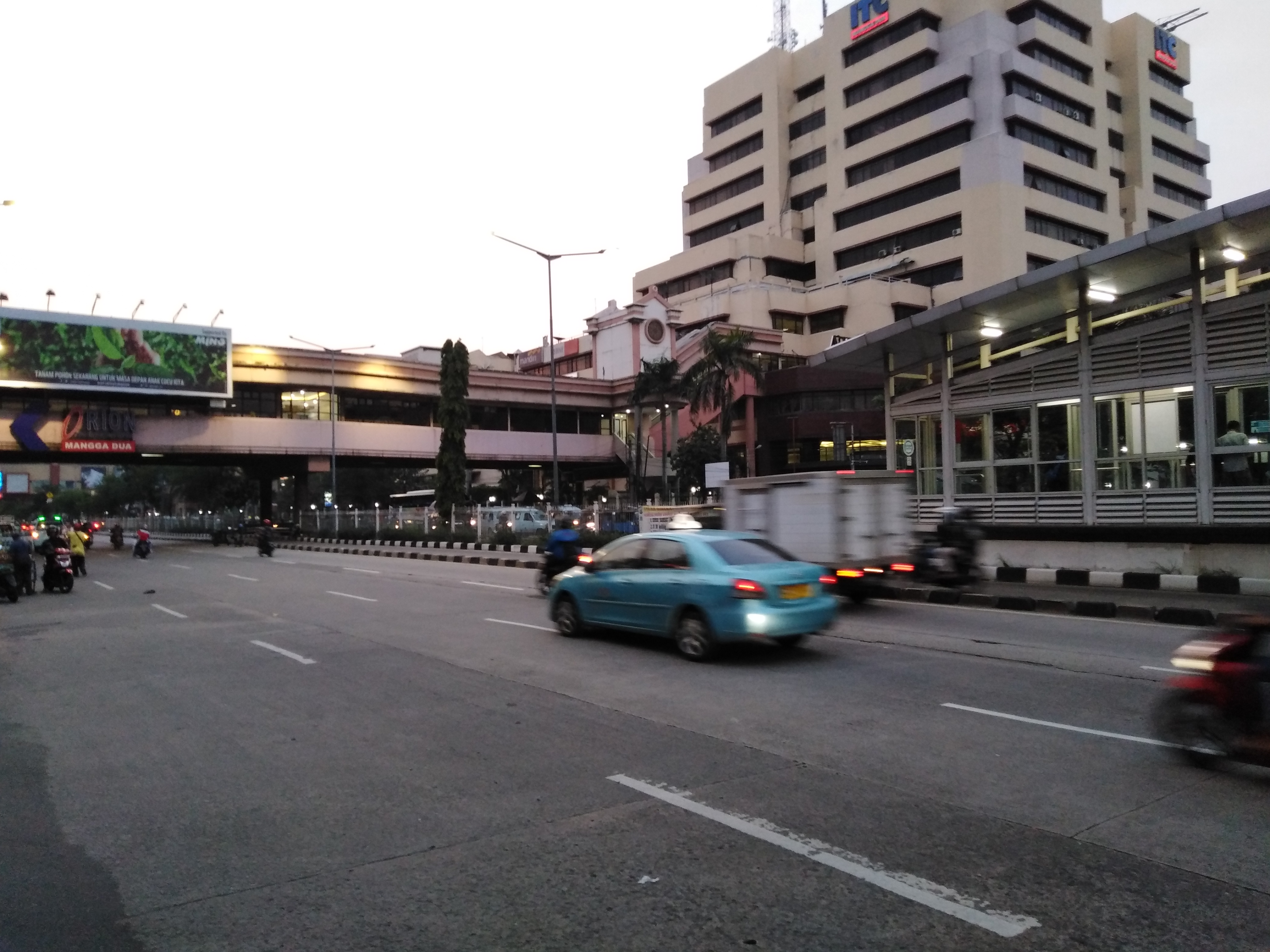
TransJakarta bus station at Mangga Dua

== Transport ==
Mangga Dua can be reached by buses of TransJakarta corridor 5K and corridor 12. There are many other bus services provided by APTB, Mayasari Bakti and Kopaja. Jakarta Kota railway station and Kampung Bandan railway station of Jakarta Commuter Rail is close to the area.

== See also ==
- Glodok
- Chinatowns in Asia
- List of shopping malls in Indonesia
