= Tunjungan Plaza =

Shopping centre in Surabaya, Indonesia

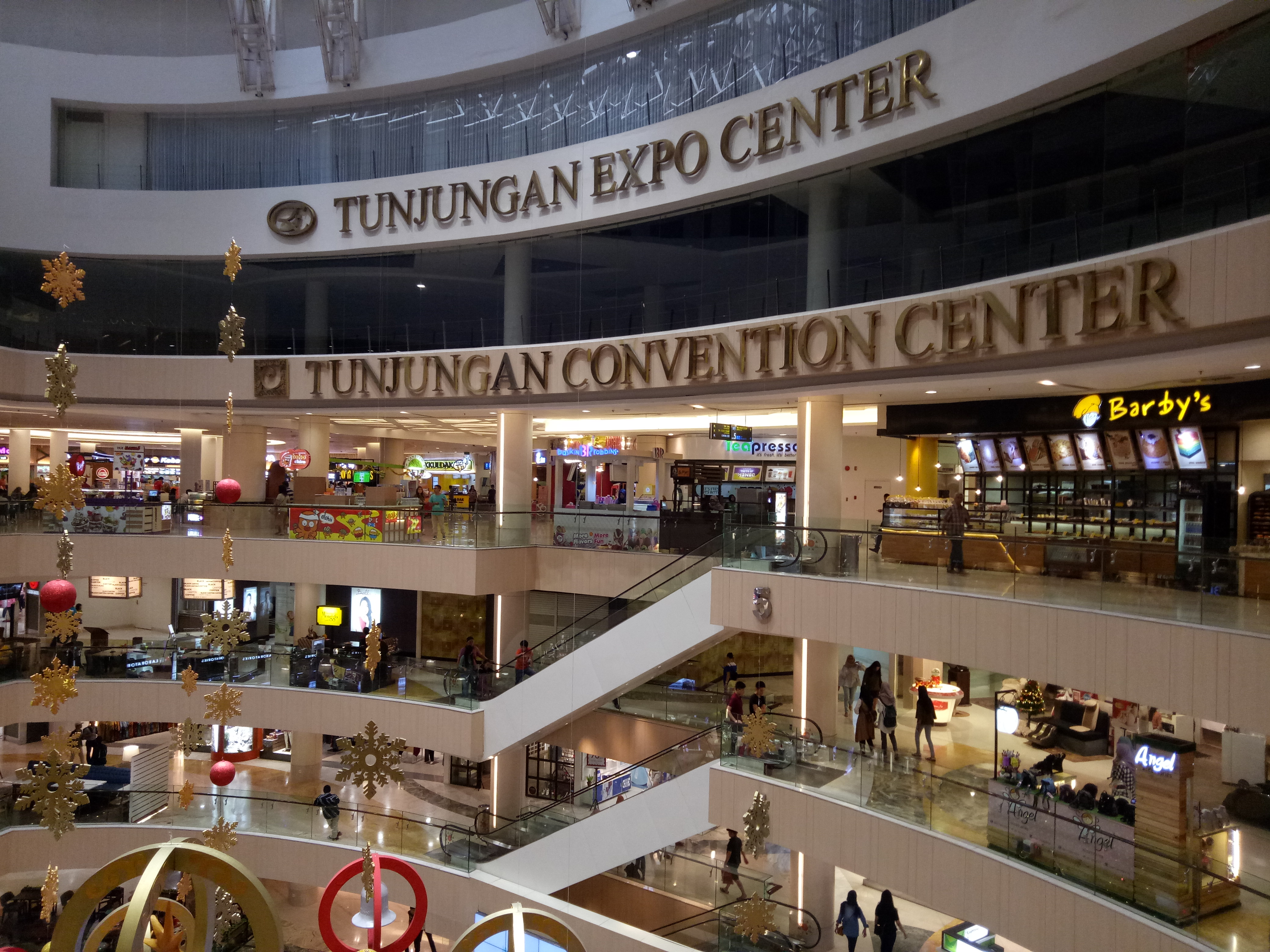
- Tunjungan Plaza interior with Tunjungan Convention and Expo Center
- Location: Surabaya
- Coordinates: 7°15′46″S 112°44′21″E
- Address: Jalan Basuki Rahmat no. 8–12, Jalan Embong Malang no. 1–31.
- Opened: 15 December 1986 (Tunjungan Plaza I); December 1991 (Tunjungan Plaza II); 1996 (Tunjungan Plaza III); 11 November 2001 (Tunjungan Plaza IV); September 2015 (Tunjungan Plaza V); 23 September 2017 (Tunjungan Plaza VI)
- Developer: Pakuwon Jati
- Owner: Pakuwon Jati
- Num. of stores: 500+
- Num. of anchor tenants: 21
- Floor area: 170,000 m^{2} (1,800,000 sq ft)
- Floors: 7 (TP I), 15 (TP II), 9 (TP III - IV), 52 (TP V - VI) 1 floors below ground
- Parking: 6,500 cars
- Public transit: Suroboyo Bus: Kaliasin; Embong Malang; Trans Semanggi Suroboyo: Kaliasin
- Website: tunjunganplaza.com

Tunjungan Plaza (TP) is a mixed development superblock in Surabaya and is the second-largest shopping center in Indonesia after Pakuwon Mall, both owned-and-operated by Pakuwon Jati which has its headquarters inside the superblock. Initially inaugurated in 1986, it has a net leaseable area of 170,000 m^{2}, which houses more than 500 retail outlets including boutiques, restaurants, cafes, cinemas, bookstores, supermarkets, and children's arcade center. It is a part of Tunjungan City Superblock, an integrated multi-facilities venue, which includes the mall (Tunjungan Plaza), Menara Mandiri Office Tower at the top of TP 2, Regency Condominium and Sheraton Surabaya Hotel & Towers at the top of TP 3, Four Points by Sheraton at the top of TP 4, The Peak Residence and Pakuwon Center at the top of TP 5, One Icon Residence and Pakuwon Tower at the top of TP 6. First opened on 15 December 1986, it is divided into six buildings: TP 1, TP 2, TP 3, TP 4, TP 5 and TP 6.

== History ==
Construction of Tunjungan Plaza began in 1985 and was completed in 1986.

Tunjungan Plaza first opened on 15 December 1986 as a shopping center built on Jalan Jend. Basuki Rahmat with a tenant area of 25,000 m^{2}. In July 1990, Tunjungan Plaza was then expanded by 21,600 m^{2} and Tunjungan Plaza II was opened in December 1991. In 1994, Tunjungan Plaza changed its name to Plaza Tunjungan when the exterior renovation of Tunjungan Plaza I was carried out. In 1996, Plaza Tunjungan was expanded again by 28,300 m^{2} and Plaza Tunjungan III opened.

Logo of Plaza Tunjungan, used from 1996 until 2006.

On 11 November 2001, Plaza Tunjungan IV was opened, expanding Plaza Tunjungan by 28,300 m^{2} to 103,200 m^{2}. If Plaza Tunjungan I-III is built on Jalan Jend. Basuki Rahmat, Plaza Tunjungan IV was built on Jalan Embong Malang.

In 2006, renovations were carried out on the interior of Plaza Tunjungan I-II and the renovation was completed in 2008. Simultaneously with the renovation, Plaza Tunjungan changed its name back to Tunjungan Plaza and the mall logo was changed twice, namely in 2006 during the renovation and in 2008 after renovations were completed.

Construction of the Tunjungan Plaza expansion began in 2012, along with the exterior and interior renovation of Tunjungan Plaza III-IV. In September 2015, Tunjungan Plaza V opened, expanding Tunjungan Plaza by 19,600 m^{2} to 122,800 m^{2}, surpassing the area of Mall Taman Anggrek in West Jakarta as the third largest mall in Indonesia. Tunjungan Plaza V was inaugurated on 9 October 2015. The interior renovation of Tunjungan Plaza III-IV was completed around 2014-15, while the exterior renovation of Tunjungan Plaza III-IV was completed in 2016.

On 23 September 2017, Tunjungan Plaza VI opened, expanding Tunjungan Plaza by 122,800 m^{2} to 148,500 m^{2}, beating the area of Mal Kelapa Gading in North Jakarta as the second largest mall in Indonesia.

== Plazas ==
Tunjungan Plaza 1 building

Tunjungan Plaza has some anchor tenants such as Hero Supermarket, Matahari Department Store, Sogo Department Store, Gramedia, Ace Hardware, Electronic Solution, Planet Sports, Informa, Informa-Ashley, XXI Cinema, XXI Cinema (IMAX), Zara, Marks & Spencer, H&M, Muji, Uniqlo, LC Waikiki, Pasarame, Chipmunks, Toys Kingdom, Aeon Fantasy Kidzoona.

- Tunjungan Plaza 1, is the first mall in Surabaya located at Jalan Basuki Rahmat no 8-12. Plaza East has become a fashionable part since renovations carried out in 2006-2008. The renovation process also includes removing the capsule lift and remodeling the food court into Studio Foodcourt, which is adjacent to the Tunjungan 1 XXI cinema which is equipped with 4 studio.
- Tunjungan Plaza 2 is the first expansion of Plaza Tunjungan shopping district next to Tunjungan Plaza 1 on Jalan Basuki Rahmat no 8-12, which is located between Tunjungan Plaza I and Tunjungan Plaza III. There are Mandiri Tower at the above of this plaza, and the management office of the mall at the 5th Floor. Although it is not as big as its predecessor, Tunjungan Plaza 2 has become one of the most important parts. crowded in this business district. TAJ Tunjungan is an urban style of Muslim, a Muslim fashion center and has the largest prayer room in a mall in Surabaya, now it has become an inseparable part of other Tunjungan Plaza.
- Tunjungan Plaza 3 is the second and the biggest expansion and most extensive of Tunjungan Plaza shopping district located behind TP1. Tunjungan Plaza 3 has a large atrium which is used to host national and regional events. It has a direct access to Sheraton Hotel & Towers as well as Regency Condominium from the TP3 lobby. It also has connections to TP1, TP4, and TP6 (only 1st and 2nd Floor). At the end of 2016, the Tunjungan 21 cinema was transformed into the Tunjungan 3 XXI cinema, after 20 years the cinema was opened.
- Tunjungan Plaza 4 is the third expansion in Tunjungan Plaza shopping districts which located on Jalan Embong Malang no 7-21. This section of the Plaza is focused on pampering shoppers and culinary enthusiasts as various international boutiques and selected food outlets enliven the plaza targeting this high-end segment. Sogo Department Store was the biggest anchor tenant of this part of plaza. Four Points Hotel by Sheraton is located on the top of this plaza, which was built together with TP5 and already opened in 2015. This plaza connects to TP3, TP5, and TP6. In mid-2017, all tenants in TP 4 floors LG (except SOGO) were closed and filled by Uniqlo which opened on 1 September 2017.
- Tunjungan Plaza 5, is the fifth stage, above it is The Peak Residence which consists of 52 floors. Construction was carried out in 2012 and completed in 2015 with the opening in September 2015 and inauguration on 9 October 2015. This section of the shopping center has the nickname "Fashion Avenue" which has a variety of fashion outlets, which consist of shopping mall, offices (Pakuwon Center), condominium (The Peak Residences), located on Jalan Embong Malang no. 1-5 houses the "Fashion Avenue" which has many branded fashion retail outlets. It houses the IMAX which operated by XXI Cinema.
- Tunjungan Plaza 6 is the newest part of Tunjungan City Superblock and the new expansion of the mall. Located on Jalan Embong Malang no 21-31, next to the Sheraton Hotel & Towers, has been operating since 23 September 2017. This shopping center is located next to TP 4. There are two towers at the top of TP 6: One Icon Residence and Pakuwon Tower. TP6 mostly consists of F&B retails and it has a connection bridge to TP3 at the 2nd Floor. This section of the shopping center surrounds the Grand Circle Tunjungan Plaza.
- Tunjungan Plaza 7 was announced during the Grand Opening of TP6 ceremony to be the upcoming project of Pakuwon Group. Pakuwon will expand their mall again for 40,000 m^{2}.

== Incident ==
On 13 April 2022, Tunjungan Plaza 5 caught on fire due to a short-circuit. The fire was extinguished in less than an hour before it could spread to neighboring buildings, and it was confirmed that there were no casualties. Videos of the fire from an outside view surfaced and spread around Indonesian social media users. After the incident, Tunjungan Plaza stayed open while Tunjungan Plaza 5 stayed temporarily closed for repair and investigation.

== See also ==
- Pakuwon Mall
- List of tallest buildings in Surabaya
