= Pakuwon Mall =

Biggest shopping centre in Surabaya and Indonesia

- Pakuwon Mall in 2021
- Location: Surabaya, East Java, Indonesia
- Coordinates: 7°17′22.5″S 112°40′30.4″E
- Address: Jalan Puncak Indah Lontar 2, Surabaya
- Opened: 2003 (Supermal); 2004 (PTC); 2017 (Pakuwon Mall); 2020 (PM Home Pro)
- Developer: Pakuwon Jati
- Owner: Pakuwon Group
- Num. of stores: 300+
- Num. of anchor tenants: 22
- Floor area: 200,000 m^{2}
- Floors: 6
- Parking: 5,000 cars
- Public transit: Trans Semanggi Suroboyo: Halte PTC
- Website: pakuwonmall.com

Pakuwon Mall (formerly Supermal Pakuwon Indah) is a shopping centre in Surabaya, Indonesia. It is the largest mall in Indonesia with a net leasable area of 200,000 m^{2}. This mall is connected with Pakuwon Trade Center (PTC). It is on Jalan Puncak Indah Lontar at Pakuwon Indah Superblock complex at 30-hectare land area, at the CBD of West Surabaya. At the top of Pakuwon Mall, there are four tower apartments, which are called Orchard and Tanglin Tower, Anderson and Benson Tower, and there are two condominium towers called La Riz and La Viz. As of 2024, La Viz is still under construction. Also, there are 2 hotels right above this mall, The Westin and Four Points by Sheraton. This mall was first opened in November 2003 by PT Pakuwon Jati Tbk, two years after Pakuwon Group opened Tunjungan Plaza 4. Pakuwon Mall has six floors, while Pakuwon Trade Center has only three.

On 22 February 2017, Pakuwon Mall (expansion of Supermal Pakuwon Indah) officially opened, and Pakuwon Group changed the mall name from "Supermal Pakuwon Indah" into "Pakuwon Mall". Pakuwon Mall - Pakuwon Trade Center was claimed by Pakuwon to be the biggest mall in Indonesia with the net (retail) leasable area of 180,000+20,000 m^{2} (including PM Home Pro).

== Awards ==
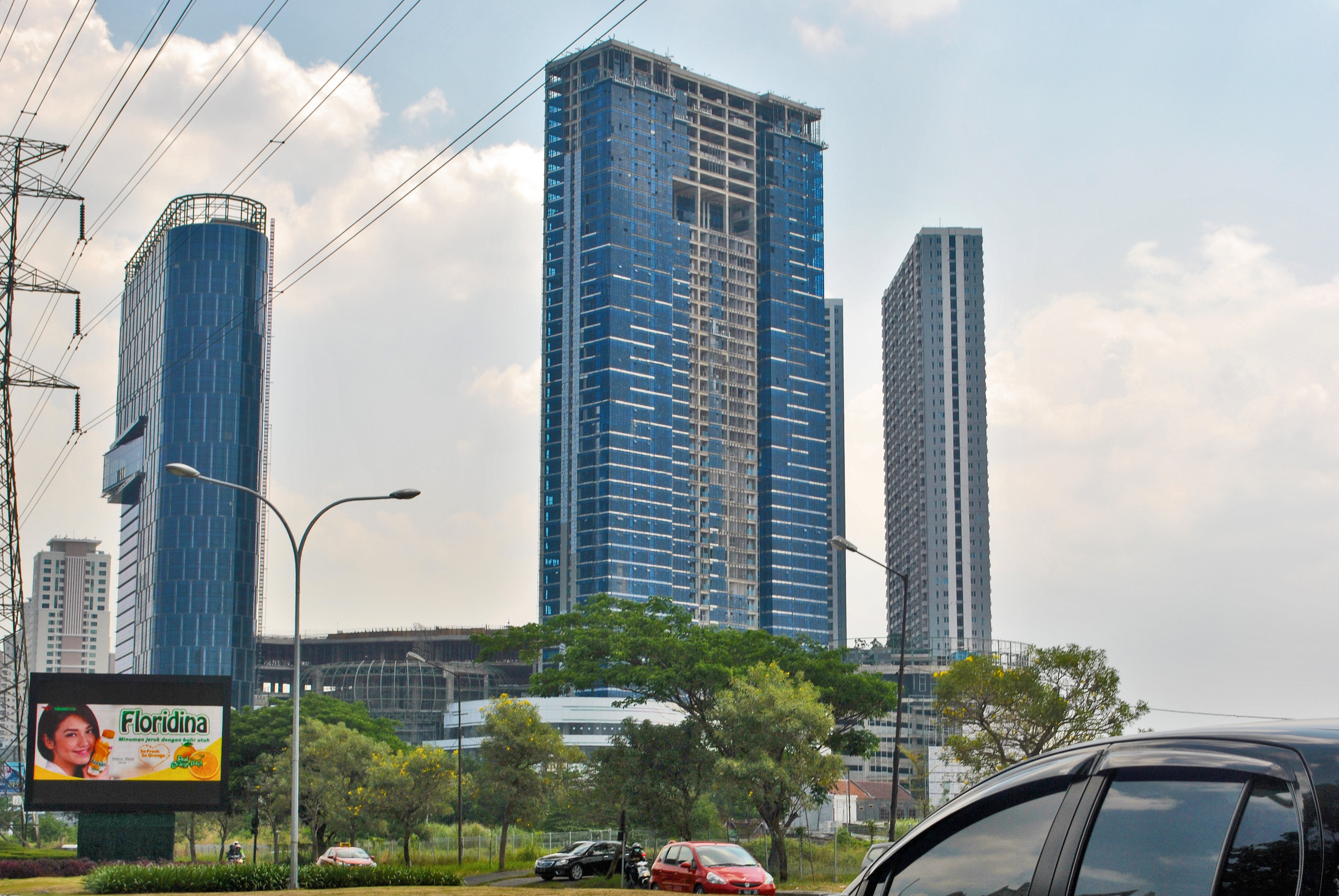
Pakuwon Mall while under construction in 2016

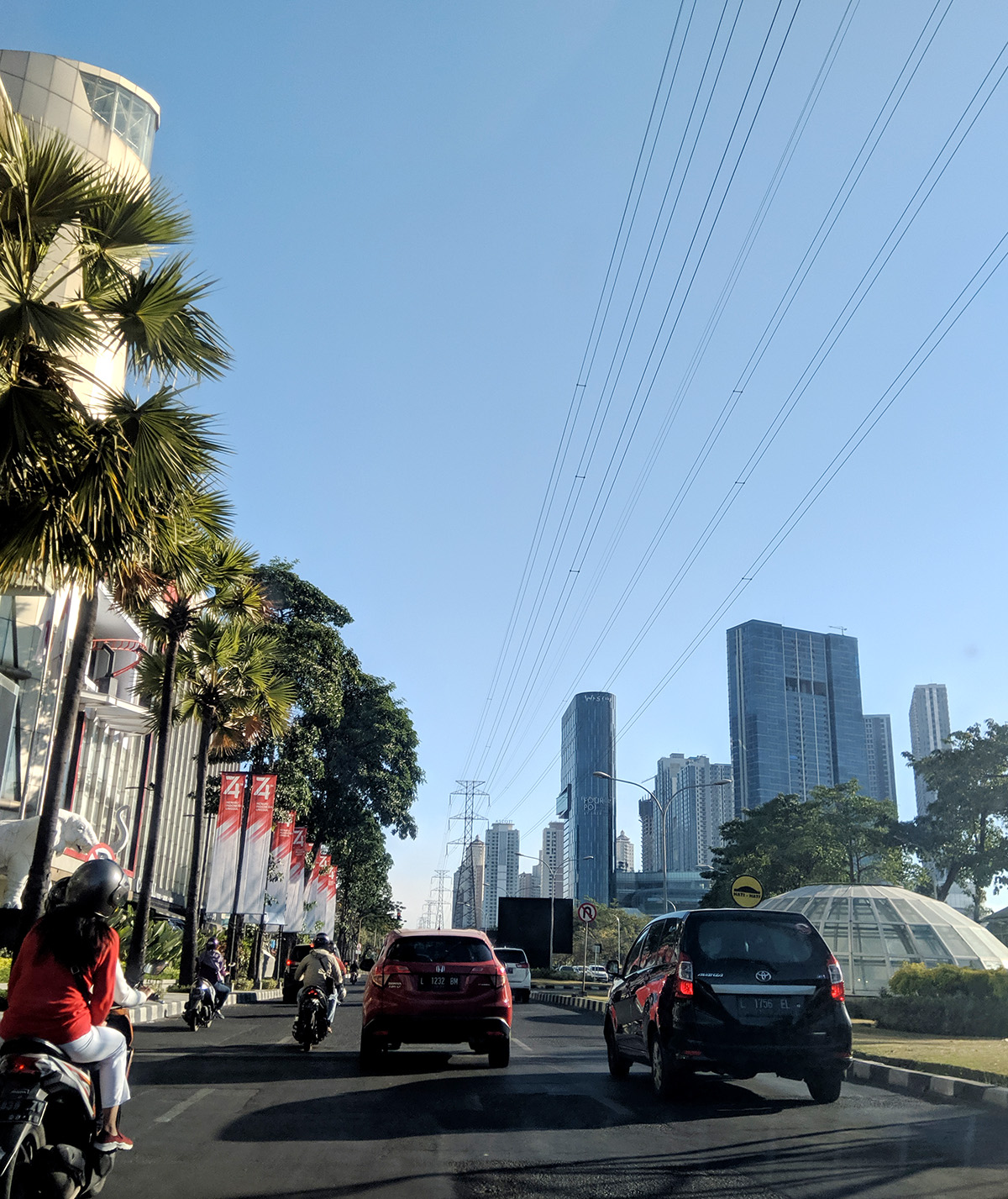
Mayjen Jono Sewojo road in 2019

Best Retail Development (Indonesia Property Awards 2017)

== See also ==
- List of tallest buildings in Surabaya
