= Jalan Letnan Jenderal S. Parman =

Road in West Jakarta

- Jalan S. Parman
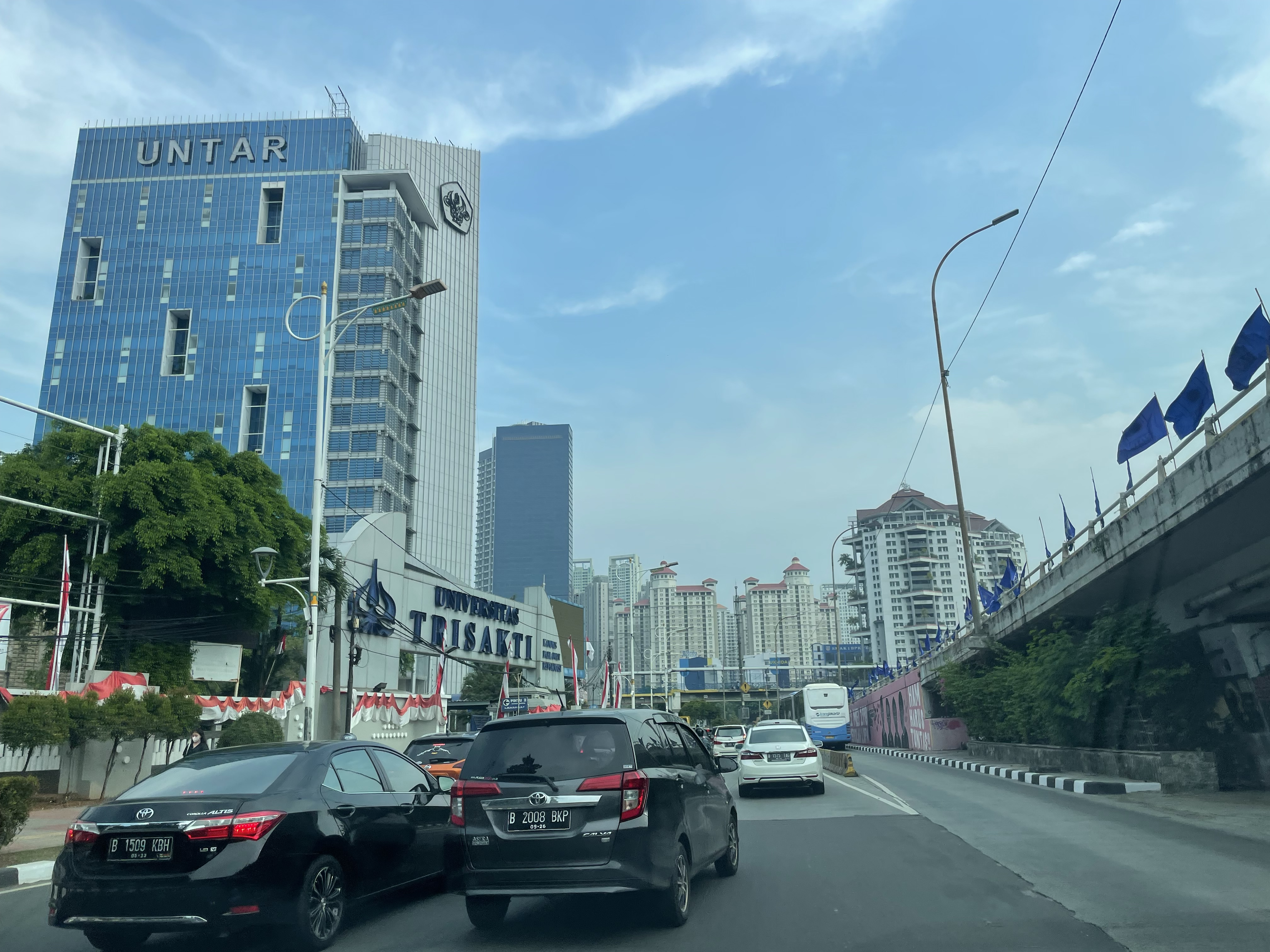
- Owner: Pemprov DKI Jakarta
- Maintained by: Dinas Pekerjaan Umum DKI Jakarta
- Length: 4.2 km (2.6 mi)
- Location: West Jakarta
- North-West end: Grogol, West Jakarta
- South-East end: Slipi, West Jakarta

Jalan Letnan Jenderal S. Parman or Jalan S. Parman is an avenue in Jakarta, Indonesia.

The road is named after National Hero of Indonesia Lieutenant General S. Parman. This 4.2 km road stretches from Grogol intersection to Slipi, West Jakarta. This road crosses urban 7 villages of Jakarta.

- Slipi
- Palmerah
- Kemanggisan
- Kota Bambu
- Tanjung Duren North
- Tanjung Duren South
- Tomang

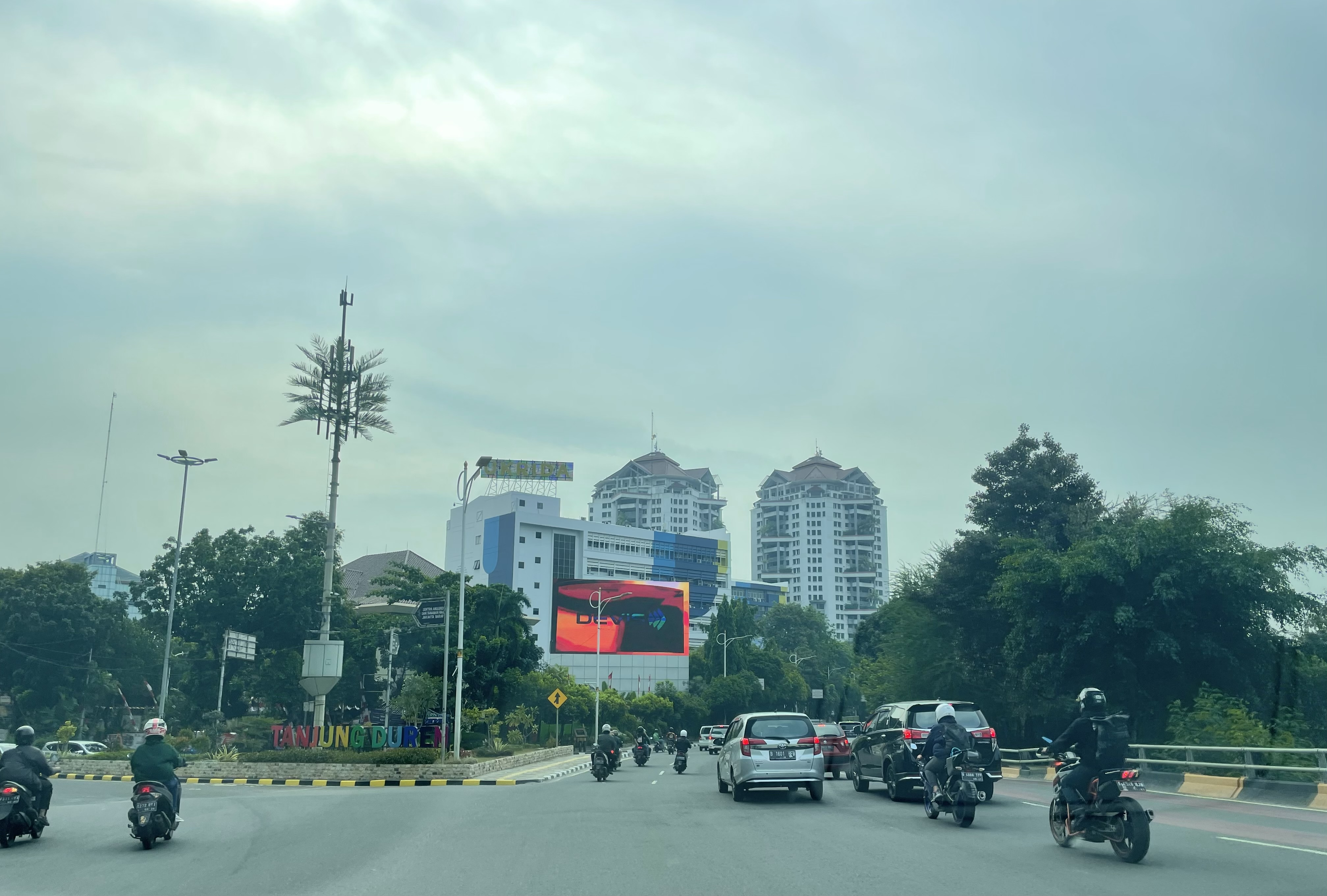
Letnan Jenderal S. Parman Road heading north

This road is traversed by Jakarta Inner Ring Road. Some of the largest malls in Jakarta Mall Ciputra, Central Park Jakarta and Mall Taman Anggrek located in this road. Tarumanegara University, Krida Wacana Christian University and Trisakti University are also located on this road at Tomang administrative village. The road is served by TransJakarta Corridor 9.

== Important landmarks ==
- Podomoro City
- Ciputra Shopping Mall
- Taman Anggrek Shopping Mall
- Central Park Shopping Mall
- Trisakti University
- Tarumanegara University
- Krida Wacana Christian University

== Intersections ==
This road has 4 intersections, namely:

- Intersection of Jalan Daan Mogot and Jalan Kyai Tapa
- Junction of Jakarta-Tangerang Toll Road and Tomang Raya Road
- towards Jalan Kemanggisan Utama Raya and Jalan Brigjen Katamso
- towards Palmerah Utara Road and Jalan Aipda KS Tubun

== Transportation ==
Jalan S. Parman is served by TransJakarta Corridor 9. Other bus service providers such as Kopaja, Mayasari Bakti and APTB buses also operates different routes. DAMRI has routes that connects the road with Soekarno-Hatta International Airport.

== See also ==
- History of Jakarta
