= Central Park Jakarta =

Large development complex with shopping mall, office, hotel, and apartments in Jakarta

Central Park
- Central Park Mall taken from Skywalk
- Location: West Jakarta, Jakarta, Indonesia
- Coordinates: 6.177745°S 106.791015°E
- Address: Unknown
- Opened: 9 September 2009
- Developer: Agung Podomoro Group
- Manager: Unknown
- Owner: Unknown
- Num. of stores: Unknown
- Num. of anchor tenants: 7
- Floor area: 119,624 m² (1,287,622 sq ft)
- Floors: 9
- Parking: 4298 cars
- Public transit: Tanjung Duren
- Website: centralparkjakarta.com

Central Park in Jakarta, Indonesia is a large development complex including a hotel, shopping mall, an office tower, and three apartment buildings covering an area of about 655,000 m^{2} (7,050,000 sq ft) located in the district of Grogol Petamburan, West Jakarta developed by the Agung Podomoro Group and part of Podomoro City. Central Park is currently the 6th largest mall in Indonesia.

== History ==
Central Park Jakarta was inaugurated on 9 September 2009, on the site of Integrated Mega Projects of Podomoro City that was located in West Jakarta. The main principle was Singaporean DP Architects, while American DYXY acted as the interior designer, and American Bennit Design Group as the landscape consultant. The main contractor for the complex was Total Bangun Persada. It was named after the original Central Park in New York City. Central Park Jakarta is situated in between Mall Taman Anggrek and Mall Ciputra.

== Architecture ==
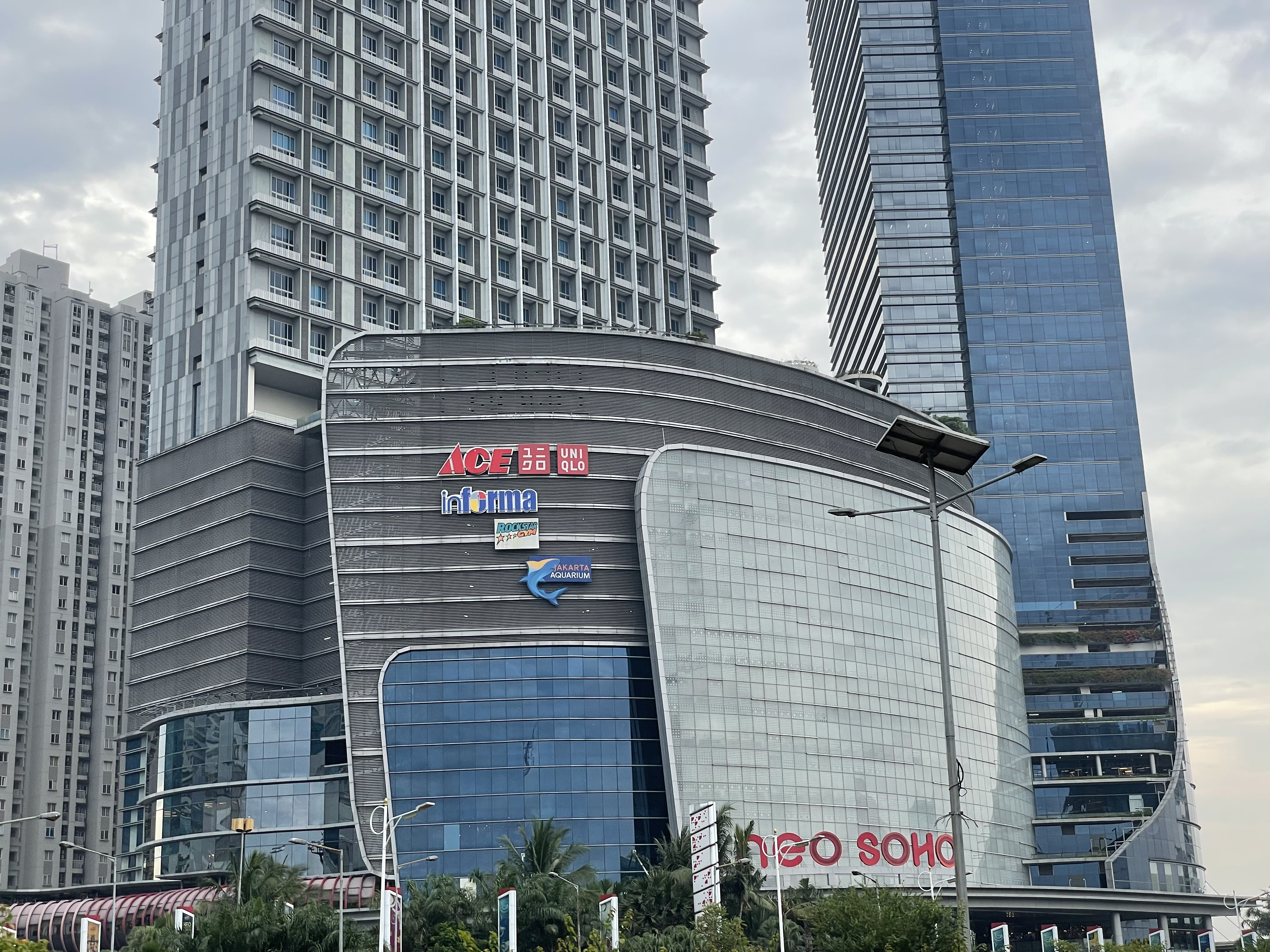
Neo Soho shopping mall, connected to Central Park mall

NEO SOHO, a new shopping center icon by Agung Podomoro Land with an eight-storey “store within-a-store” concept, has been built and connects to Central Park through the iconic Eco Sky Walk. It is now has been renamed as Central Park 2 starting 22 November 2025. The shopping mall features a musical fountain at the park area with daily shows. It also features a large outdoor park, with some tenants, named Tribeca Park.

== Tenants ==
The shopping mall has anchor tenants such as Sogo (the largest SOGO in Indonesia), Transmart, Gramedia, CGV, Zara, Marks & Spencer, Hugo Boss, Bershka, and others. The Jakarta Aquarium & Safari, one of the biggest aquariums in the city, is also located inside the shopping mall.

== Awards ==
- Asia Pacific Highly Commended Retail (Asia Pacific Property Awards 2011).
- National Best Retail Development (Asia Pacific Property Awards 2011).

== Incidents ==
In November 2016, the cladding on the Neo-Soho tower ignited. A similar fire at Grenfell Tower occurred in September 2017.

On 8 August 2026, a fire ignited the upper part and the bottom part of the Pullman Hotel Jakarta on 6:59. There were no fatalities.

== Gallery ==
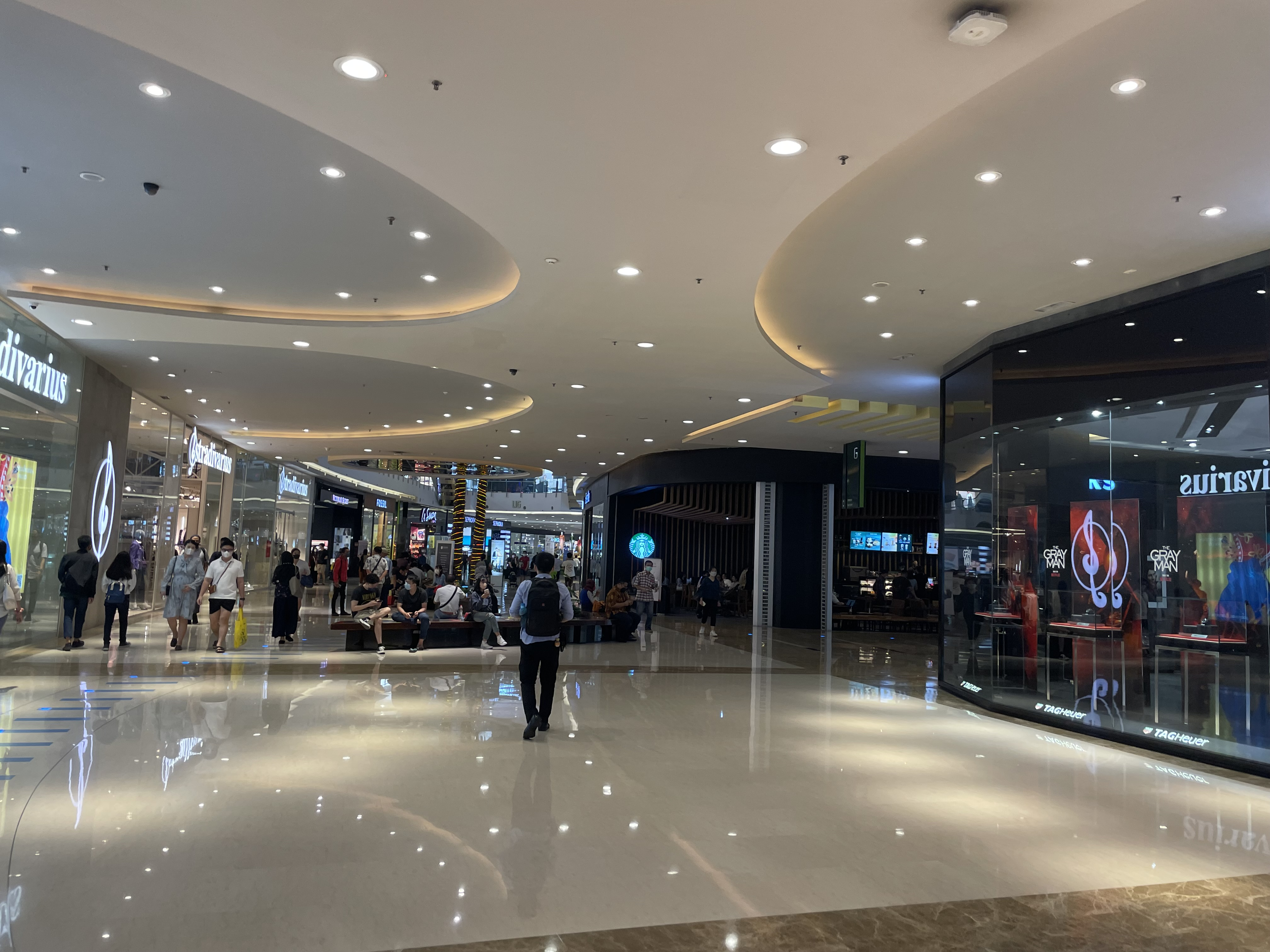
Interior of the mall

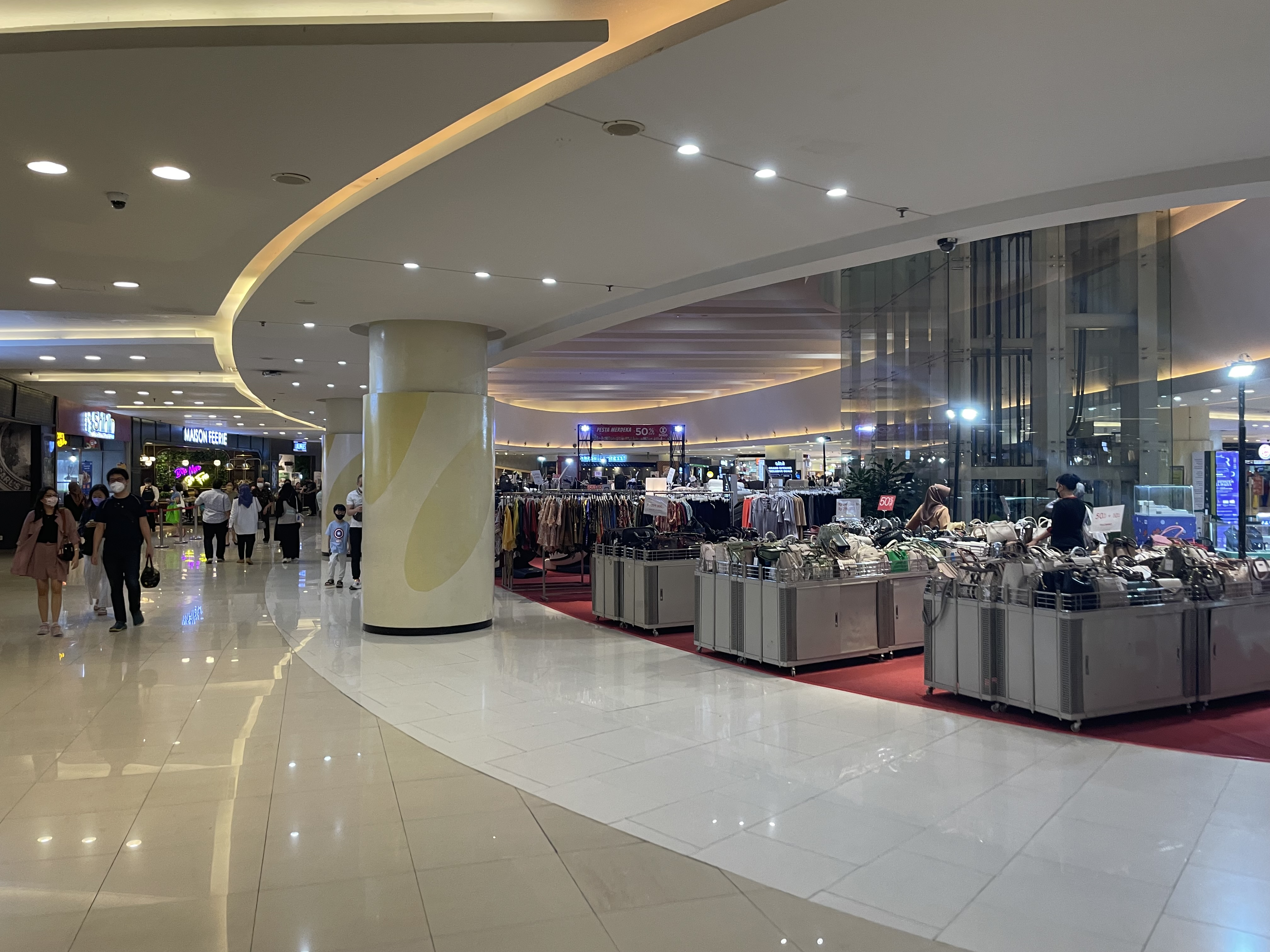
Interior of the mall

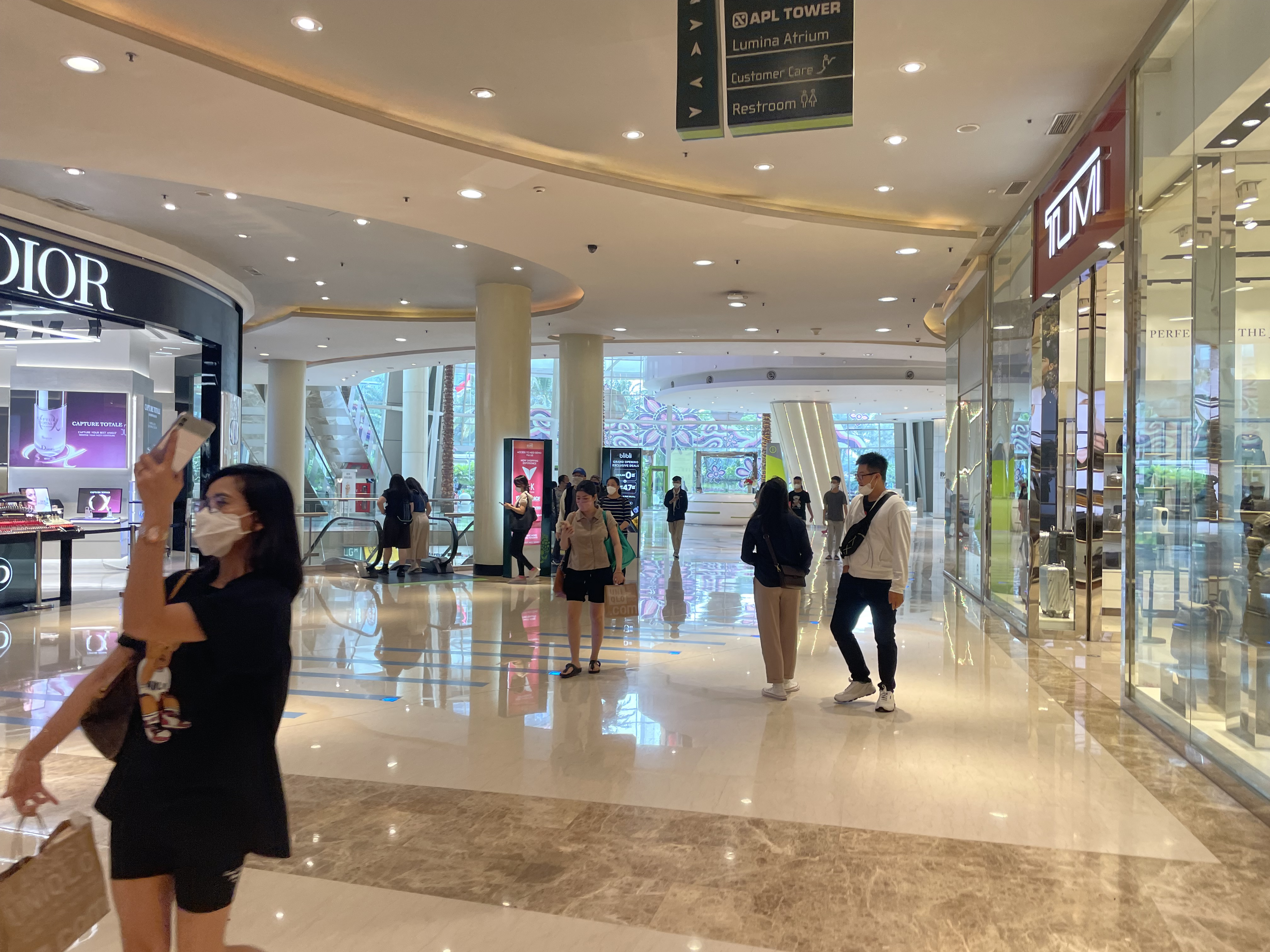
Interior of the mall

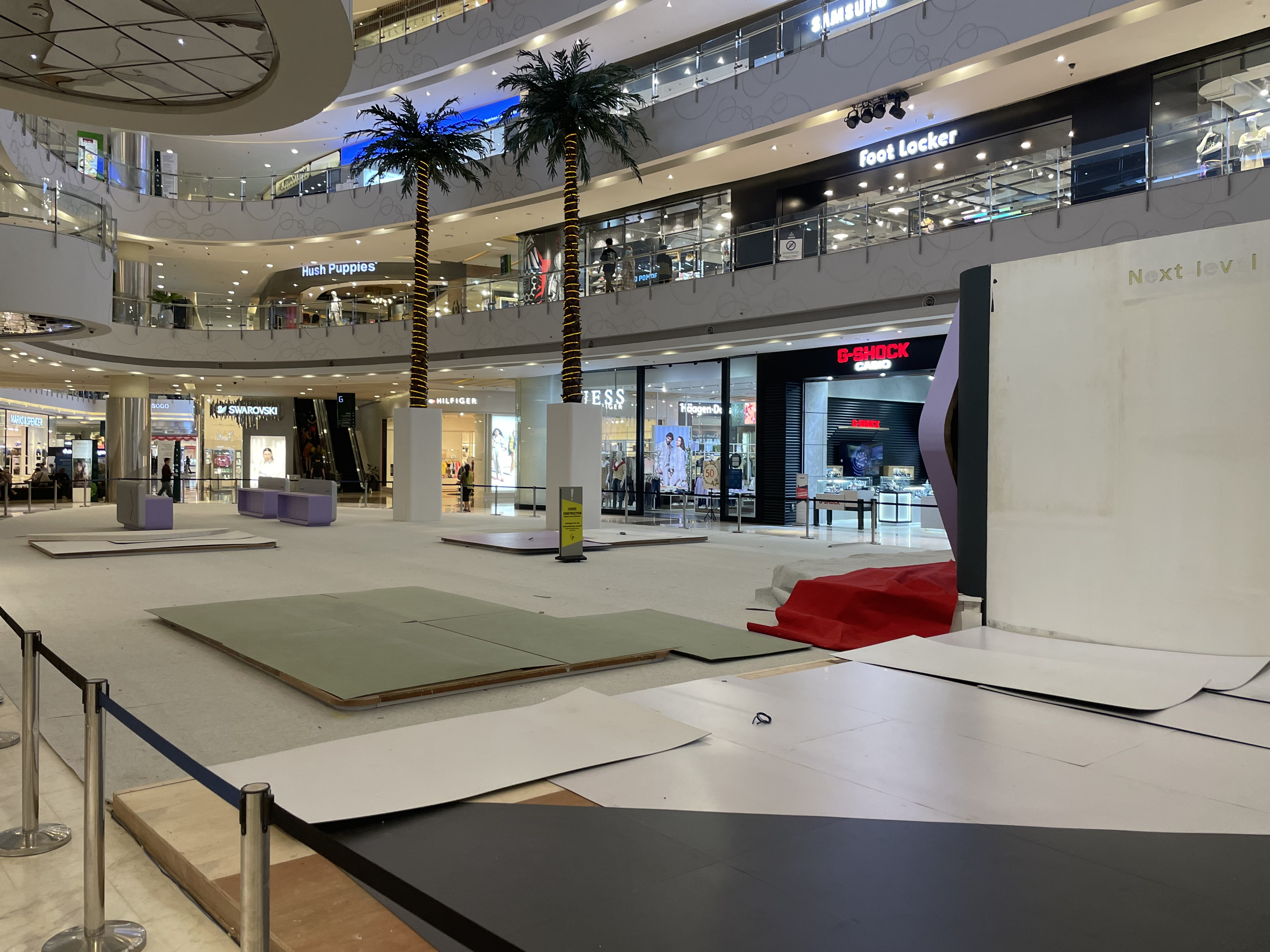
Interior of the mall

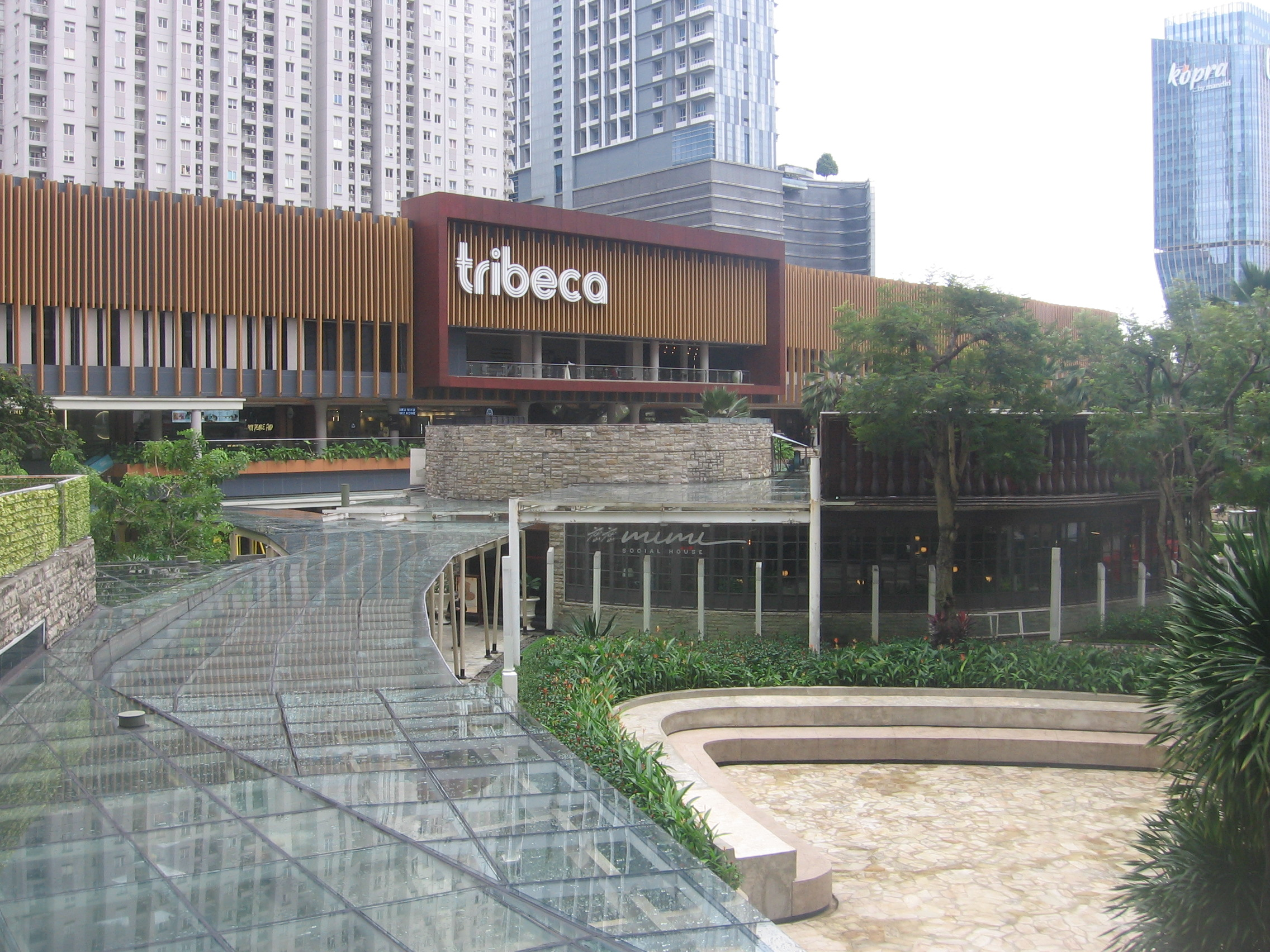
Tribeca Park

== See also ==
- List of largest buildings in the world
- Top reviewed places in ASEAN
