= Harapan Kita Cardiovascular Hospital =

Hospital in Jakarta, Indonesia

- Ministry of Health

Geography
- Location: Letjen S. Parman Street Kav. 87, Slipi, Palmerah, West Jakarta, Jakarta, Indonesia

Organisation
- Type: Public

History
- Opened: 9 November 1985

Links
- Website: pjnhk.go.id
- Lists: Hospitals in Indonesia

Harapan Kita Cardiovascular Hospital (Indonesian: Rumah Sakit Jantung dan Pembuluh Darah Harapan Kita or RSJPD Harapan Kita), also known as the Harapan Kita National Cardiovascular Center (Indonesian: Pusat Jantung Nasional Harapan Kita) is a cardiac hospital located in Jakarta, Indonesia.

In 2017, sources said it was affected by the WannaCry ransomware attack,, but the Indonesian Hospital Association (Persi) denied this.
