= Textile Museum (Jakarta) =

Textile museum in West Jakarta, Indonesia

Coordinates: 6°11′50.65″S 106°48′10.50″E

Textile Museum Museum Tekstil
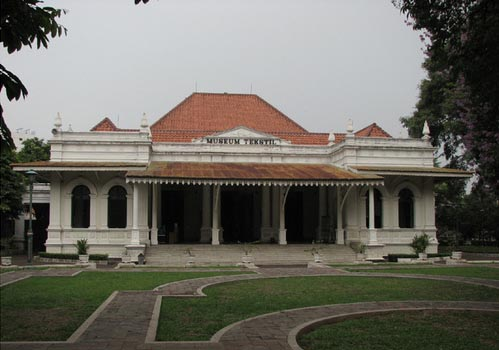
- The front view of the Textile Museum
- Established: July 28, 1976
- Location: Jalan Aipda K.S. Tubun 4, West Jakarta 11421, Indonesia
- Type: Textile museum
- Public transit access: Tanah Abang

The Textile Museum (Indonesian: Museum Tekstil) is a museum in Palmerah, West Jakarta, Indonesia. The museum houses a collection of textiles from various islands in Indonesia.

== History ==
The Textile Museum building was constructed in the early 19th century. Initially it was a private house of a Frenchman. The building was later sold to Abdul Aziz Al Mussawi al Musa Khadim, a Turkish consul for Batavia. In 1942, the building was sold again to Karel Cristian Cruq.

The building had been used as the headquarters of Barisan Keamanan Rakyat ("Front of People's Safety") during the struggle for independence period. In 1947 it was owned by Lie Sion Phin who rented it to the Department of Social Affairs which modified it into an institution for elderly people. Afterwards the building was handed over to the city's government.

On July 28, 1976, it was inaugurated as the Textile Museum by Madame Tien Soeharto.

== Collections ==
The textile museum exhibits many kinds of Indonesian traditional weaving such as Javanese batik, Batak ulos, and ikat. There are also displays of traditional weaving instruments and equipment for textile production.

== See also ==
- Colonial architecture of Indonesia
- Indonesian Heritage Society
