= Grogol =

- Administrative village
- Interactive map of Grogol
- Country: Indonesia
- Region: Special Capital Region of Jakarta
- City (Kota): West Jakarta
- District (Kecamatan): Grogol Petamburan

Area
  - Total: 1.22 km^{2} (0.47 sq mi)

Population
  - Total: 27,896
  - Density: 22,900/km^{2} (59,200/sq mi)
- Postal code: 11450

Grogol is an urban administrative village in the Grogol Petamburan subdistrict of West Jakarta, Indonesia. The triangle-shaped administrative village is bounded by the West Flood Canal to the east, Jakarta Inner Ring Road to the west, and Jalan Kyai Tapa to the south. It was among the first Jakarta's planned suburb established during the 1960s.

As of 2004 it had a population of 27,896. It has postal code of 11450.

== History ==
Grogol started as a lunatic asylum which was converted in a Japanese Internment Camp for civilians during World War II.

Triangle-shaped Grogol began as a new residential suburb built on 25 hectares of land. This land has been allocated by the Jakarta city government in 1952 for housing, especially for public servants which includes a number of members from the parliament. The area was established around the 1960s.

Grogol was located on the eastern side of the West Flood Canal and was designed to be flood-proof as a conscious effort to address Jakarta's regular flooding problems. Despite the planning, heavy rains in February 1960 flooded the residential area in Grogol up to the knee and waist. The February 1960s flooding was the first crisis for Governor Soemarno, who was installed only days before the floods began.

== See also ==
- Grogol Petamburan
- List of administrative villages of Jakarta

== Cited works ==
- Merrillees, Scott (2015). Jakarta: Portraits of a Capital 1950-1980. Jakarta: Equinox Publishing. ISBN 9786028397308.
