= Tanjung Duren Selatan =

- Administrative village
- Interactive map of Tanjung Duren Selatan
- Country: Indonesia
- Province: Jakarta
- City: West Jakarta
- District: Grogol Petamburan
- Postal code: 11470

Tanjung Duren Selatan is an administrative village in the Grogol Petamburan district of Indonesia. It has postal code of 11470.

== See also ==
- Grogol Petamburan
- List of administrative villages of Jakarta
