= Grogol Petamburan =

Coordinates: 6.1648°S 106.7881°E

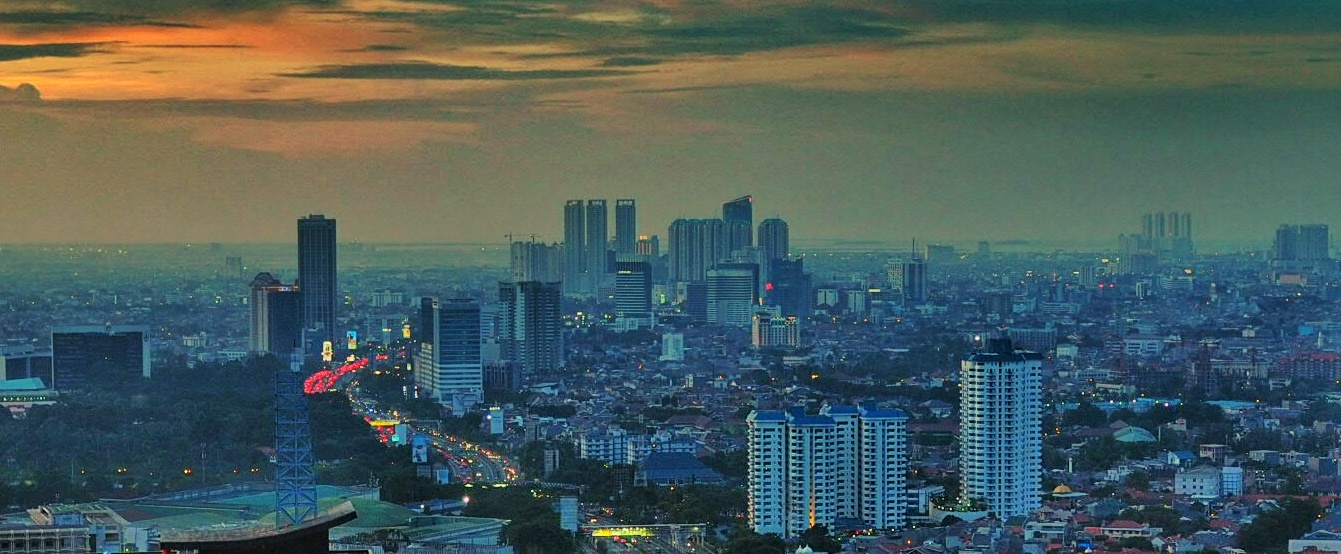
Grogol Pertamburan district skyline

Grogol Petamburan is a district (Indonesian kecamatan) of West Jakarta, Indonesia, roughly bounded by the West Flood Canal to the east, Angke Canal to the west and to the north, and Jakarta-Merak Tollway to the south. It has an area of 9.99 km^{2}. As of 2004, the use of the land was 58.0% for housing, 12.5% for offices, 3.8% in parkland, and 2.2% in farmland with the remainder in other uses or idle. The official estimate of population as at mid 2023 was 237,367.

Some of the largest malls in Jakarta — Ciputra, Taman Anggrek and Central Park — are located in Grogol Petamburan District's Tanjung Duren Selatan kelurahan. The universities of Tarumanegara and Trisakti are also located in Grogol Petamburan, in Tomang kelurahan.

== Administrative villages ==
Grogol Petamburan is divided into seven Kelurahan (populations as at mid-2022):

- Tomang (188 ha), with a population of 35,825 - area code 11440
- Grogol (122 ha), with a population of 36,275- area code 11450
- Jelambar (144 ha), with a population of 34,683 - area code 11460
- Jelambar Baru (14 ha), with a population of 48,498 - area code 11460
- Wijaya Kusuma (220 ha), with a population of 46,920 - area code 11460
- Tanjung Duren Utara (134), with a population of 20,457 - area code 11470
- Tanjung Duren Selatan (177 ha), with a population of 20,685 - area code 11470

== List of important places ==
- Podomoro City
- Ciputra Shopping Mall
- Taman Anggrek Shopping Mall
- Central Park Shopping Mall
- Tarumanegara University
- Trisakti University
- Krida Wacana Christian University
