= CGV =

CGV may refer to:

- Charron, Girardot et Voigt, early 20th-century motor car
- CGV Cinemas Indonesia, an Indonesian cinema chain
- CJ CGV, South Korean cinema chain

== See also ==
- Ship prefix for Norwegian (NoCGV) and Icelandic (ICGV) coast guard vessels
