= Palmerah =

Sub-district in West Jakarta

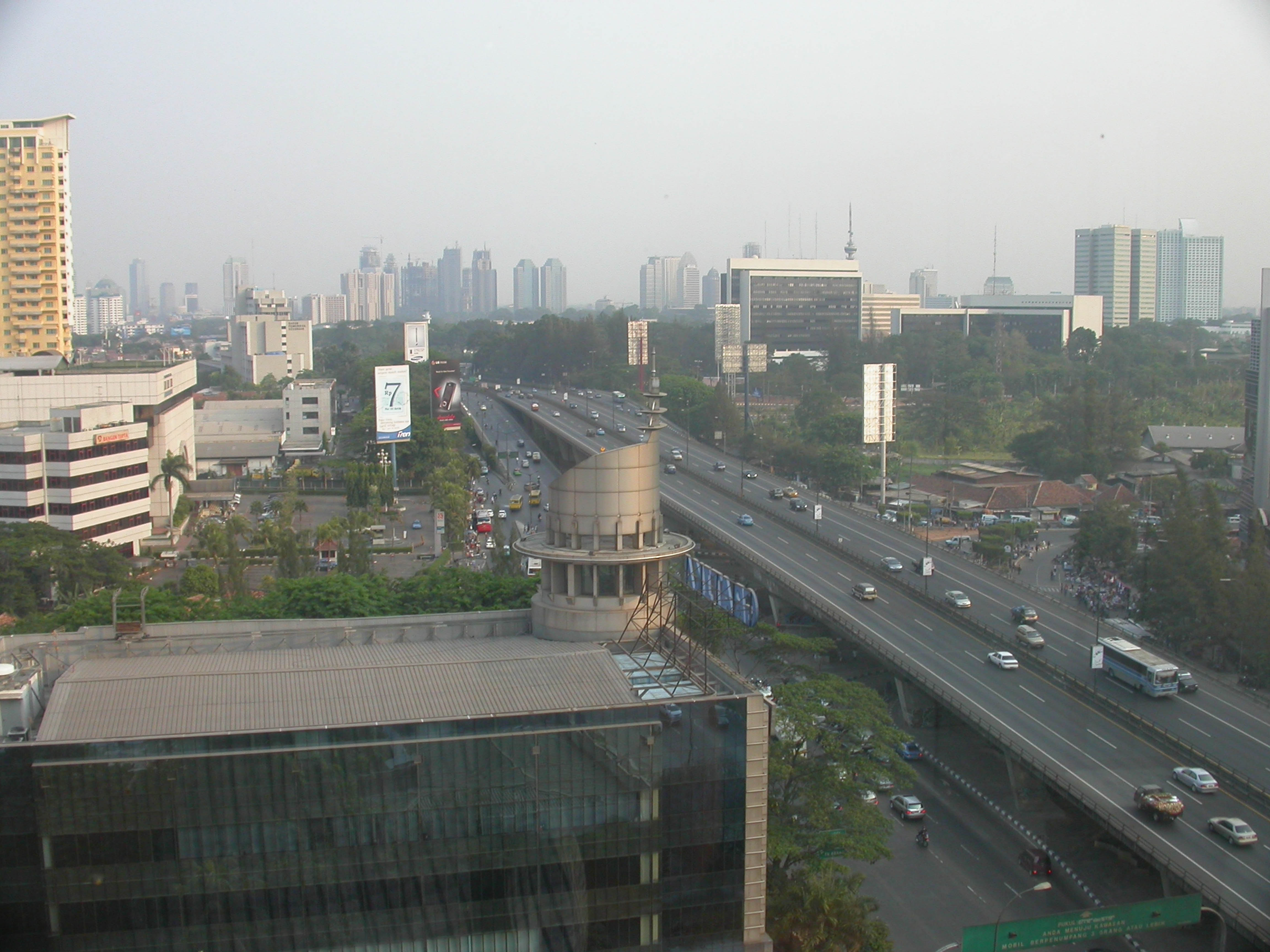
Gatot Subroto Street and Letjen S Parman Street Intersection

Palmerah is a district (kecamatan) of West Jakarta Administrative City, Indonesia. The district is roughly bounded by Jakarta-Merak Tollway to the north, Batusari - Rawa Belong Road to the west, Palmerah Barat - Palmerah Utara Road to the south, and Aipda K. Sasuit Tubun Road - Western Flood Canal to the east.

S Parman Road and Jakarta Inner Ring Road Tollway, one of Jakarta's main artery, crosses the center of Palmerah District.

== Kelurahan (Administrative Villages) ==
Palmerah is divided into six Kelurahan (Administrative Villages)

- Slipi - area code 11410
- Kota Bambu Utara - area code 11420
- Kota Bambu Selatan - area code 11420
- Jatipulo - area code 11430
- Palmerah - area code 11480
- Kemanggisan - area code 11480

== Tourist attractions ==
- Textile Museum
- Rumah Sakit Pelni
