= Mall Taman Anggrek =

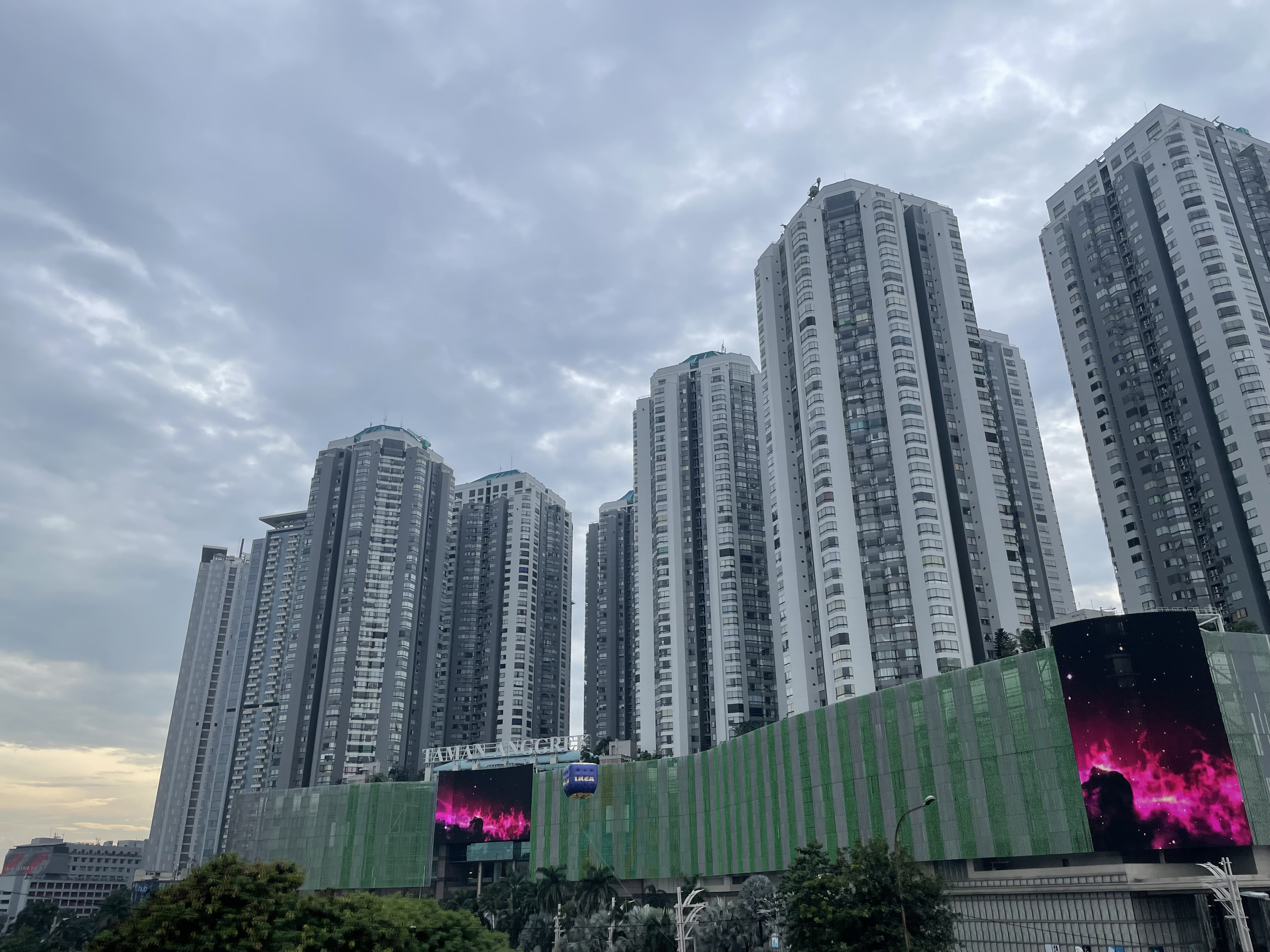
- Exterior facade of the mall building
- Location: West Jakarta, Indonesia
- Address: Lt. Gen. S. Parman Street No.Kav 21, Grogol Petamburan, West Jakarta, Jakarta, Indonesia, Postal Code 1147
- Opened: August 28, 1996
- Developer: PT Mulia Intipelangi
- Manager: PT Mulia Intipelangi
- Owner: PT Mulia Intipelangi
- Num. of stores: 526
- Num. of anchor tenants: 9 IKEA; Matahari; Azko; Fitness First; Cinema XXI; Decathlon; Uniqlo; Hero Supermarket; Skyrink Jakarta
- Floor area: 360,000 m^{2} (3,900,000 sq ft)
- Floors: 7 (retail)
- Parking: 4000 cars
- Public transit: Tanjung Duren
- Website: taman-anggrek-mall.com

Taman Anggrek Mall (Indonesian: Mal Taman Anggrek; literally "Orchid Garden Mall"), commonly known as Mall Taman Anggrek, abbreviated as MTA, is a shopping mall in Grogol Petamburan, West Jakarta, Indonesia. The mall is named after a real orchid garden within the now-demolished Orchid Hotel site, which occupied the building site prior to construction; that orchid garden has since been relocated near Taman Mini Indonesia Indah.

The retail podium was the largest shopping center in Southeast Asia when it first opened in 1996, up until the opening of Berjaya Times Square in Kuala Lumpur in 2003. It remains as the largest mall in Indonesia. The mall is nestled within eight condominium towers and its Plaza Level (PL), known as the Taman Anggrek Condominium. The mall houses more than 500 specialized stores, spread within seven floors. The mall has a gross leasable area (lettable retail space) of 360,000 m^{2} (3,900,000 sq ft).

Throughout the complex, there are more than 20 exhibition areas, including an 800 square metres (8,600 sq ft) center atrium which hosts major events and exhibitions, such as the ASEAN Countdown 2000. The mall also boasts Southeast Asia's oldest running indoor ice rink, the 1,240 square metres (13,300 sq ft) sized Skyrink Jakarta, which was officially opened on August 20, 1997. Taman Anggrek also hosts a 8,675.3 square metres (93,380 sq ft) LED facade, which once held the Guinness World Record for the world's largest illuminated LED facade when completed in 2012. In January 2017, MTA was also recognized by Forbes as one of the top shopping malls in Jakarta.

During its inception in 1994, the Indonesian-based Mulia Group under Mulialand entered a joint venture with Peter Gontha's PT Sinar Estetika and Titiek Soeharto's PT Maharani Paramitra to create Mulia Intipelangi, Mulialand's subsidiary as well as developer/manager of the Taman Anggrek complex. The Taman Anggrek complex, both condominiums, and mall, was designed by Altoon + Porter Architects (now Stir Architecture).

In 2022, to replace several departing major and small retailers (like Metro Department Store, Zara, Gramedia, and Sephora), MTA welcomed 3 anchor tenants and several other replacement tenants - such as IKEA, the returning Matahari, and Electronic City. IKEA debuted their first city store concept in Indonesia in a 9400 sqm space covering two floors (level 3 and 4) and housing 3 food & beverage concepts (Restoran Swedia, Kafe Swedia, and Bistro Swedia), groundbreaking on 28 October 2021 and grand opening on 7 April 2022. Matahari Department Store officially returned on Thursday, 14 April 2022.

== Tenants ==
=== Current tenants ===
Anchor Tenants: IKEA (L3-L4), Matahari (UG-L1), Fitness First (L4-P6), Cinema XXI (L3-L4), Decathlon (L1), Uniqlo (UG), Azko (L2), Hero Supermarket (P2), Skyrink Jakarta (L3)

Major Specialty Tenants: Electronic City (G), Playfield Preschool & Kids Academy (G), Nano Healthy Family (G), Oh!Some (L2), Sports Station (L1), Erafone (L3), Planet Sports (L1), Batik Keris (G), Mothercare & Wilio (G), Toys Kingdom (L1)

Major Entertainment Tenants: Timezone (G), Fun World (L3), Apple Bee Kids Playground (L2), Cocoland X (G)

Major Food & Beverage Tenants: LimaLima Food Court (L4), Haidilao (L1)

Retail Tenants: Adidas, Arena, Crocs, Kettler, Polo, Puma, Skechers, The Athlete's Foot, Mondial Jewelers, Frank & Co., The Palace National Jeweler, Belva Jewellery, Emperor Jewellery, MBJewellery, Gramedia Expo, Glory Jewellery, Golden Eiffel, Logam Tunggal, Swan Jewellery, Swing Watch, Optik Melawai Gallery, Optik Seis, Optik Tunggal, Kosé, L'Occitane en Provence, Nature Republic, The Body Shop, Martha Tilaar Shop, Asus - Microsoft, Huawei, Samsung Experience Shop, Vivo, Digimap, Guardian, GNC, Watsons, Century Healthcare, Ariston, Rinnai, Simmons & Airland, Cellini Design Center, Saint James Hankook Ceramic, Sleep & Co., Sleep Center, Tecnogas, EF English First, Hyundai City Store, etc.

Food & Beverage Tenants: Starbucks, Din Tai Fung Chef's Table, Pizza Hut, Yoshinoya, Bee Cheng Hiang, KOI Thé, Fore Coffee, Baskin-Robbins, A&W, KFC, Saint Cinnamon, Monsieur Spoon, Acaii Tea, Bakmi GM, Fiesta Steak, D'Crepes, Sate Khas Senayan, Ramen Seirock-ya, Steak 21 Buffet, Sushi Hiro, Ta Wan, Toast Box, Old Town White Coffee, Tous Les Jours, Oddity, etc.

=== Former tenants ===
Alongside current tenants, MTA has had an array of former tenants in different specialties since its opening in 1996, such as former anchors JCPenney Collections (international franchise of JCPenney) from 1996 to late 1997, the now-defunct middle-end Rimo Department Store flagship from 1996 to 2006 (occupying two levels first before expanding into three levels in 1999), and Marks & Spencer was also an anchor in the mall when it first opened with a 3000-square-meter flagship store (the largest store in Asia) that closed in 1999 in the midst of Mark & Spencer's switch of Indonesian franchisee, before moving into a two-level store in 2001, downsizing in the late 2000s, and finally closing in the mid-2010s. Local middle-low clothing store Pojok Busana also enjoyed its presence as an anchor, from 1996 until the early 2000s. The Gramedia bookstore closed its Taman Anggrek anchor space in 2020 before returning in 2024 as Gramedia Expo, after opening in 1999, while Metro Department Store closed its Taman Anggrek anchor space in January 2022 (after downsizing their store in 2018), 20 years after its opening in February 2002.

Aside from the former anchors, there were also multiple entertainment vendors which had opened in MTA, such as the SS Dunia Main Sega arcade, Timezone (which from 1996 until 2018 opened in various locations within the mall, such as inside Megakidz and in two separate levels), the Inul Vizta Karaoke bar, and two children daycares, Gymboree and Tumble Tots. Laser Quest is also noted to have once opened an outlet in the mall, along with a virtual reality center during the 1990s. More recently, the children's playground Little Boss Play & Eat has closed due to the COVID-19 pandemic.

Alongside the former anchors and entertainment, vendors were multiple major specialty stores, such as the Furnicenter, Agis Elektronik, Toko Gunung Agung, Karisma Modern Bookshop, Electronic Solution, and Tarra Megastore (a record shop that occasionally hosted press conferences for international artists coming to Jakarta, such as Stephen Gately in July 2000 and the A1 boyband in March 2001). More notable major tenants were the Warner Bros. Studio Store (which opened in January 1997), a Toyota showroom, a Mercedes-Benz showroom, Mango, La Senza, Zara (their first store in West Jakarta when it opened in 2006), and Sephora (opening in 2016 and closing late 2021).

Numerous international labels ranging from middle to upper segments have also opened in MTA, such as Tirta (casualwear collection of Iwan Tirta), Replay Country Store, Club Monaco, BOSS Hugo Boss, Aigner, Inscription Sonia Rykiel, Lacoste, Folli Follie, Mandarina Duck, Springfield Menswear, Linea Pelle, Chomel, Benetton, Paul Smith, Aldo, Guess, Guess Accessories, Ellesse Italia, Levi's, Clarks, Nine West, OshKosh B'gosh, Timberland, Rockport, Ocean Pacific, O'Neill, Pony International, Royal Elastics, Quiksilver, Chicco, Yves Rocher, Bata, Crocodile, VNC (Indonesian retailer of Vincci), Swatch, Steve Madden, Charles & Keith (one of their first two international boutiques when opening in 1998), Pedro, Tracce, and Everbest. Many fast fashion brands have also opened up shop throughout the years, such as Bossini, Esprit, Next, G2000, and U2. Many of these labels were flagship stores (such as Guess and Charles & Keith) and first stores in Indonesia (such as Inscription Sonia Rykiel, Mandarina Duck, O'Neill, Rockport, Pony International, Royal Elastics, VNC, and more).

Aside from specialty shops, many local and international food outlets have opened in MTA. La Brioche Dorée, Pizza Del Arte, Hartz Chicken Buffet, Samudra Seafood & Suki Restaurant are some of the 97 original food-and-beverage outlets which opened during Mall Taman Anggrek's early years of operations. Subway, HokBen, Hanamasa, Da Niang Dumpling, Thai Express, Nando's, Jollibee, Popeyes, McDonald's, Yogen Früz, Dunkin' Donuts, Arby's, and Wendy's have also once opened an outlet here.

== History of Matahari Group at Mall Taman Anggrek ==
The Indonesian retail holding group, Matahari Department Store Tbk., has a lengthy history with MTA. Located at the North Wing of the mall, their first two concepts in the mall were first opened on 19 October 1996 - the Galeria Department Store and MegaKids. Dedicated to upper-end customers with a collection of brands such as Kenzo and Balenciaga, the 11.967 sqm, three-leveled Galeria store was located on the ground floor to the first floor of the mall - which also had a separate lobby. MegaKids, a children's goods megastore located on the second floor (right above Galeria), had fashion merchandise for children with in-house brands such as Little M and toys, along with a Timezone arcade (their first location in the mall before moving to the former SS Mega Dunia Main Sega on the third floor and opening another outlet that was more kids-oriented on the second floor), a Laser Quest, and an Alfa Zona soft-play playground - all in a 4557 sqm space. Another children's good store concept by Matahari, Kids2Kids, also opened a store in the mall's ground floor. Galeria and Mega M rebranded as Matahari, with all remaining outlets throughout Sumatera and Java being converted to the Matahari brand by 2003, but the Galeria and Megakidz brands continued to operate as such in MTA.

Both Galeria and Megakidz were then redesigned as the upmarket Parisian Department Store in 2007, with a grand opening celebration held on 18 March 2008. The Parisian Department Store contained many luxury beauty and fashion brands, mostly coming from South Korea, Brazil, Malaysia, Thailand, and Hongkong - such as La Mer, Sulwhasoo, Tara Jarmon, Rock & Republic, Triumph, It. Michaa, Jack n Jill, Line by Lynn, Kenneth Lady, Poleci, Chaps, Phenomenal, Mocca, J-West, and Rabeanco. However, the Parisian concept didn't last long, as it saw the dilution of the Parisian brand into Matahari Department Store's New Generation concept, following its opening at Supermall Karawaci and Pluit Village in 2008. The store eventually closed on 3 December 2017, and MTA renovated the space alongside the upper levels of the mall's north wing, with Haidilao, IKEA, and various F&B and lifestyle tenants filling it.

In 2022, Matahari announced their return to MTA, replacing Metro Department Store. Their new concept store in MTA has a new 'flagship signature' concept, and opened on 14 April 2022. The 8200 sqm leased space has retail space of around 7835 sqm and houses 200 brands, featuring high-end to middle-end cosmetics, fragrances, and lotion skincare, with a corner curated by local multi-brand cosmetics store Sociolla. Their new space also takes over space formerly occupied by Guess Accessories, Swatch, and other tenants. Since its opening, MTA became a place for Matahari to conduct events, including its 2022 lucky draw on 24 June and recently, Matahari's new logo launch on 8 October.

== Sports ==
=== MSC 2017 ===
The MTA hosted all fourteen matches of MLBB Southeast Asia Cup dubbed "Five-Nations Finals" in 2017. The first-ever official on-stage international MLBB tournament took place in the atrium area of the mall. JKT48 performed songs as entertainment in between matches.

| No. | Date | Team No. 1 | Result | Team No. 2 | Round |
|---|---|---|---|---|---|
| 1. | 1 September 2017 | (Malaysia) Team Saiyan | 0–2 | (Philippines) Salty Salad | Upper Bracket Quarterfinals |
| 2. | 1 September 2017 | (Philippines) Solid Gaming Alpha | 2–1 | (Malaysia) MyA Junior | Upper Bracket Quarterfinals |
| 3. | 1 September 2017 | (Thailand) IDONOTSLEEP | 2–0 | (Indonesia) Elite8 Esports | Upper Bracket Quarterfinals |
| 4. | 1 September 2017 | (Singapore) Impunity | 2–0 | (Indonesia) Saints Indo | Upper Bracket Quarterfinals |
| 5. | 2 September 2017 | (Malaysia) Team Saiyan | 2–1 | (Malaysia) MyA Junior | Lower Bracket Round 1 |
| 6. | 2 September 2017 | (Indonesia) Elite8 Esports | 1–2 | (Indonesia) Saints Indo | Lower Bracket Round 1 |
| 7. | 2 September 2017 | (Philippines) Salty Salad | 2–0 | (Philippines) Solid Gaming Alpha | Upper Bracket Semifinals |
| 8. | 2 September 2017 | (Thailand) IDONOTSLEEP | 2–0 | (Singapore) Impunity | Upper Bracket Semifinals |
| 9. | 2 September 2017 | (Philippines) Solid Gaming Alpha | 2–1 | (Indonesia) Saints Indo | Lower Bracket Quarterfinals |
| 10. | 2 September 2017 | (Singapore) Impunity | 2–1 | (Malaysia) Team Saiyan | Lower Bracket Quarterfinals |
| 11. | 3 September 2017 | (Singapore) Impunity | 0–2 | (Philippines) Solid Gaming Alpha | Lower Bracket Semifinal |
| 12. | 3 September 2017 | (Philippines) Salty Salad | 2–1 | (Thailand) IDONOTSLEEP | Upper Bracket Final |
| 13. | 3 September 2017 | (Thailand) IDONOTSLEEP | 2–0 | (Philippines) Solid Gaming Alpha | Lower Bracket Final |
| 14. | 3 September 2017 | (Philippines) Salty Salad | 0–3 | (Thailand) IDONOTSLEEP | Grand Final |

=== VCL 2023 ===
The MTA hosted ten matches of Valorant Challengers 2023: Indonesia Split 2 as part of Valorant Challengers League in 2023. The atrium area served as the stage of playoff phase dubbed "Main Event" of the first official on-stage Valorant tournament in Indonesia. The stage event was organized by One Up Organizer and sponsored by YOU•C1000.

| No. | Date | Local time (UTC+7) | Team No. 1 | Result | Team No. 2 | Round |
|---|---|---|---|---|---|---|
| 1. | 31 May 2023 | 11:00 | Alter Ego | 2–0 | Le Crapaud | Upper Bracket Quarterfinals |
| 2. | 31 May 2023 | 14:00 | ARF TEAM | 0–2 | Dominatus | Upper Bracket Quarterfinals |
| 3. | 31 May 2023 | 17:00 | BOOM Esports | 2–0 | Alter Ego | Upper Bracket Semifinals |
| 4. | 1 June 2023 | 11:00 | Bigetron Arctic | 1–2 | Dominatus | Upper Bracket Semifinals |
| 5. | 1 June 2023 | 14:00 | Alter Ego | 2–0 | ARF TEAM | Lower Bracket Quarterfinals |
| 6. | 1 June 2023 | 17:00 | Bigetron Arctic | 2–0 | Le Crapaud | Lower Bracket Quarterfinals |
| 7. | 2 June 2023 | 14:00 | Alter Ego | 2–0 | Bigetron Arctic | Lower Bracket Semifinal |
| 8. | 2 June 2023 | 17:00 | BOOM Esports | 0–2 | Dominatus | Upper Bracket Final |
| 9. | 3 June 2023 | 14:00 | BOOM Esports | 3–0 | Alter Ego | Lower Bracket Final |
| 10. | 3 June 2023 | 17:00 | Dominatus | 1–3 | BOOM Esports | Grand Final |

== Awards ==
World's Largest LED Illuminated Facade – Guinness World Records

International Council of Shopping Centers (ICSC) Global Awards 2014 – Finalist

International Council of Shopping Centers (ICSC) Global Awards 2013 – Finalist

== Gallery ==
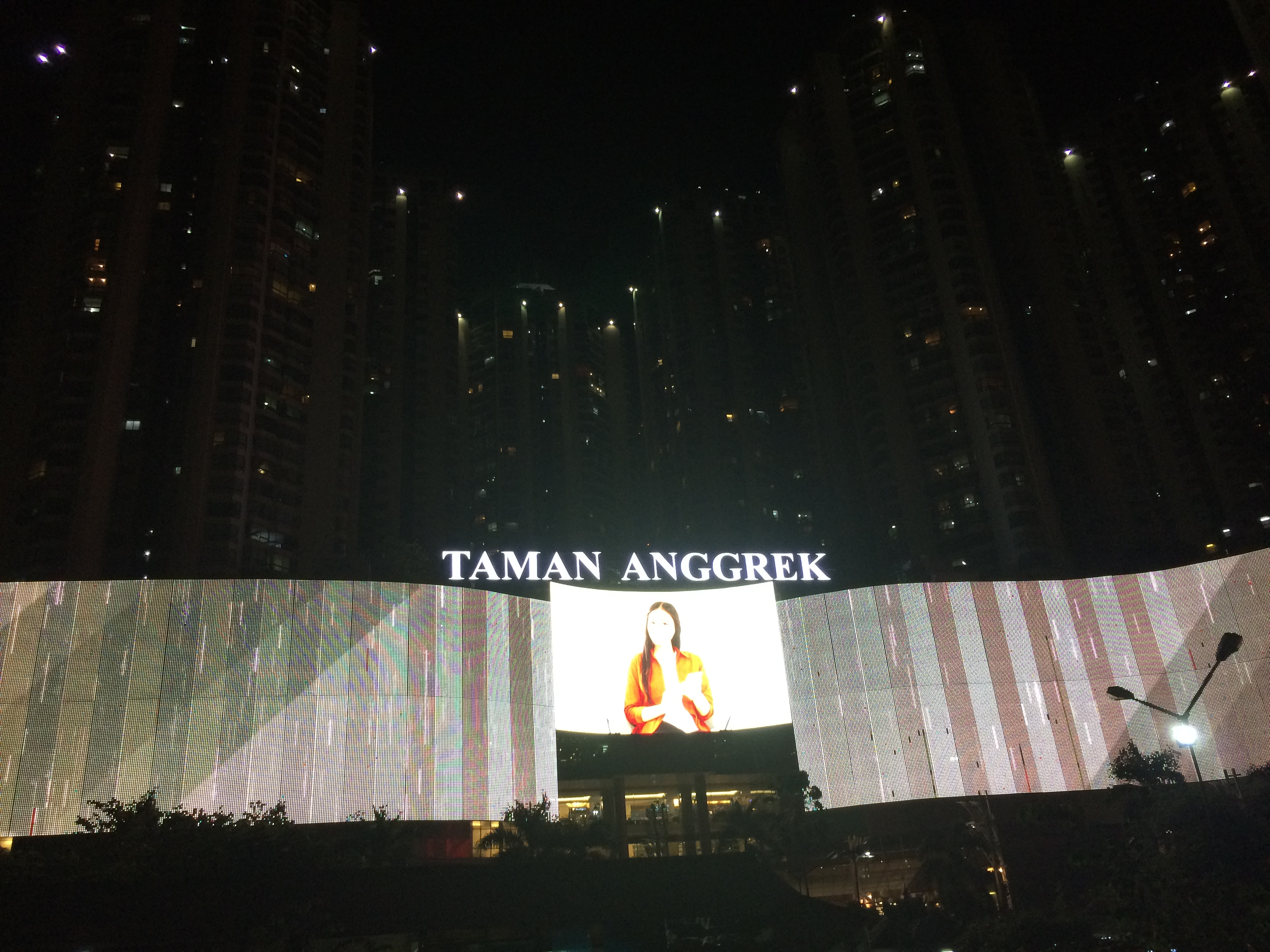
Mall Taman Anggrek once hosted the world's largest LED display recorded by Guinness World Record.

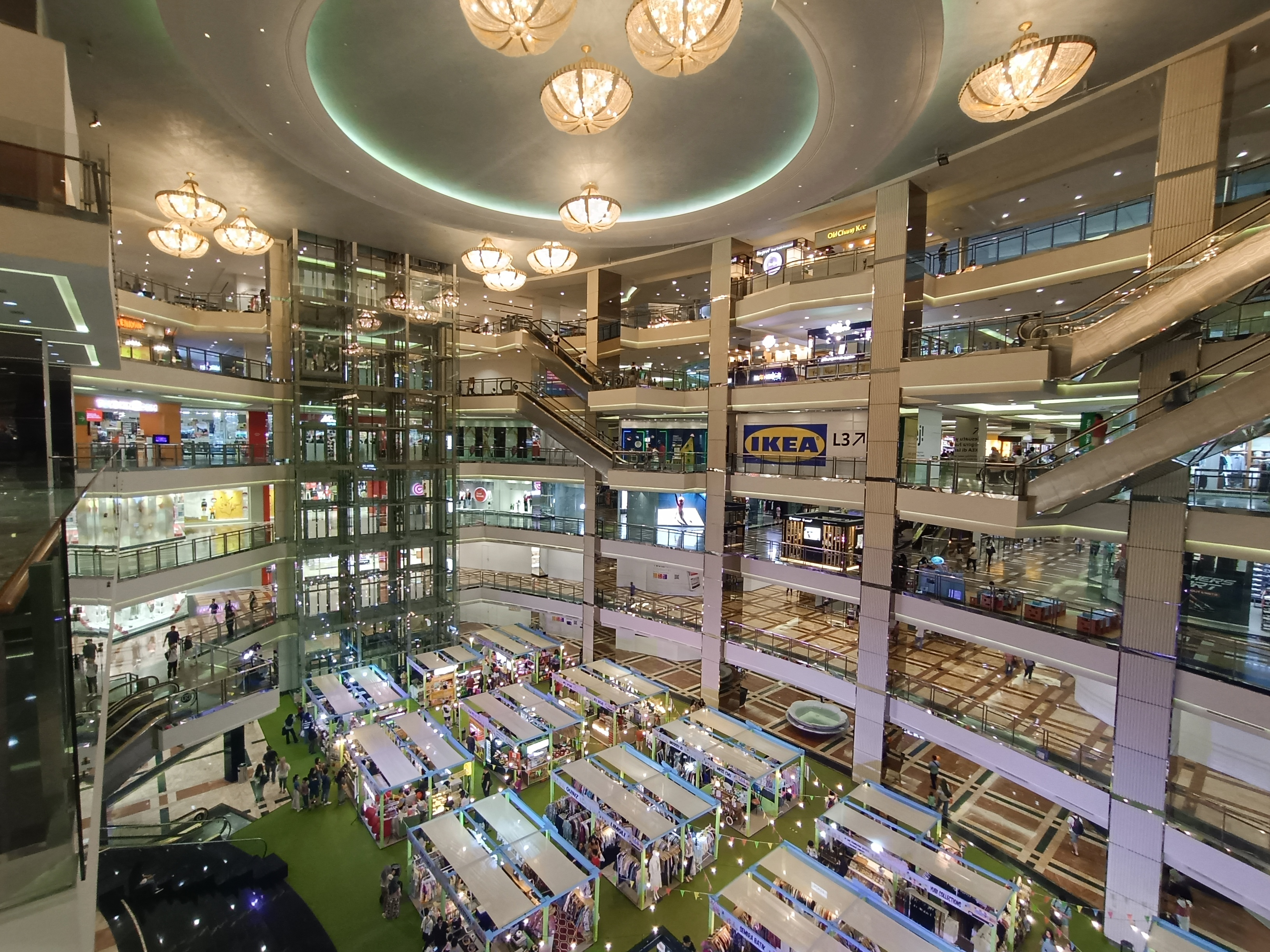
Mall Taman Anggrek's interior.

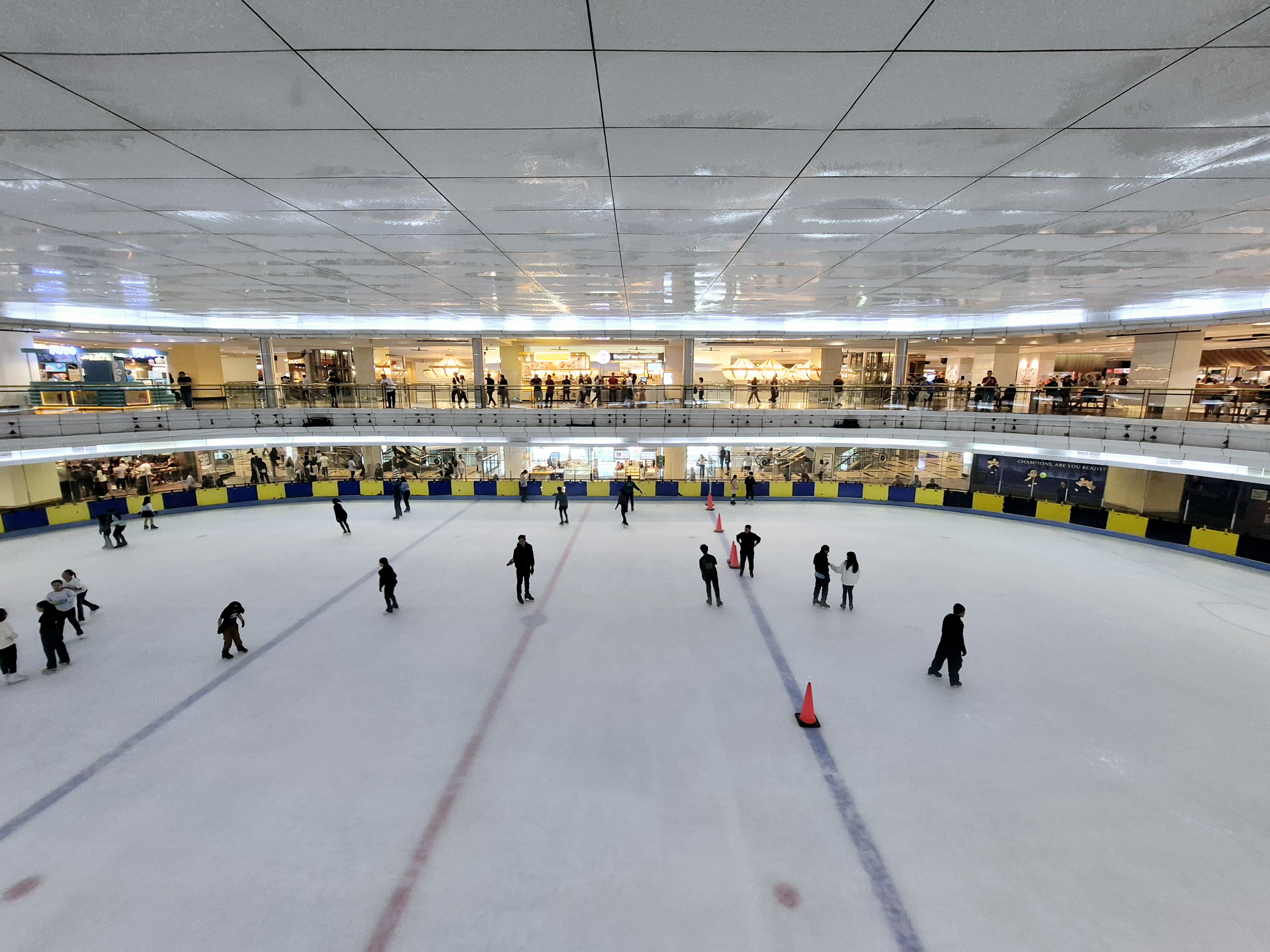
Mall Taman Anggrek's skating rink.

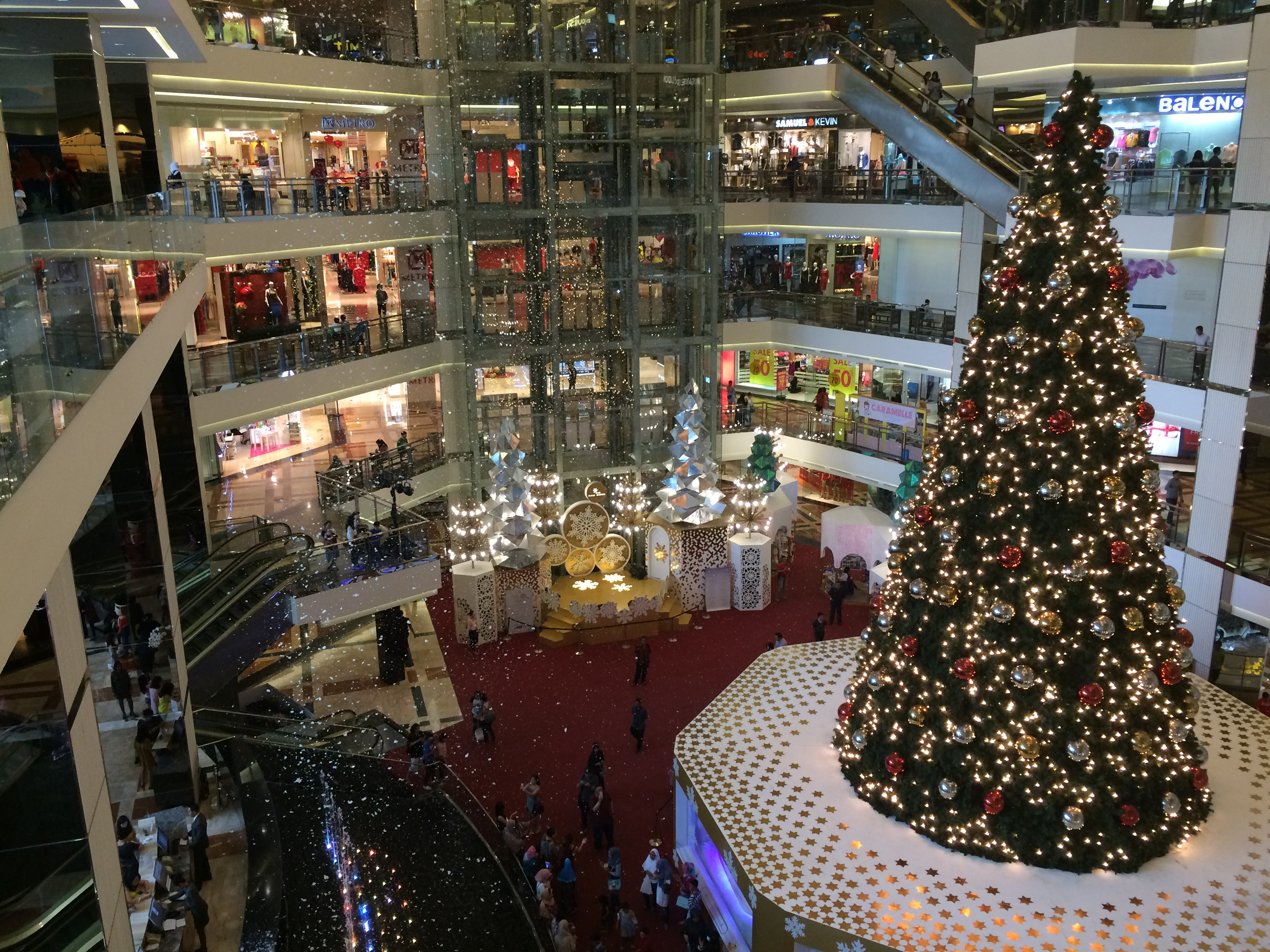
A Christmas tree in Mall Taman Anggrek.

== See also ==
- List of shopping malls in Indonesia
- List of largest shopping malls in the world
