= Krida Wacana Christian University =

Private university in Jakarta, Indonesia

The Krida Wacana Christian University
- Universitas Kristen Krida Wacana
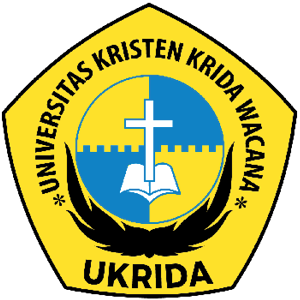
- Motto: Being Transformed to Win the Future (pre-2018); Take The lead (2018–2020); Lead to Impact (2020–present)
- Type: Private
- Established: January 20, 1967
- Affiliations: Association of Christian Universities and Colleges in Asia (ACUCA)
- Religious affiliation: Protestant
- Rector: Prof. Dr.-Ing. Herman Parung, M.Eng.
- Location: Jakarta, Indonesia
- Campus: Tanjung Duren Utara — Campus I; Kebon Jeruk — Campus II; Kelapa Gading — Campus III
- Colors: Yellow, blue and white
- Website: www.ukrida.ac.id

The Krida Wacana Christian University (Indonesian: Universitas Kristen Krida Wacana), abbreviated as UKRIDA, is a private university in Jakarta, Indonesia. It was founded on January 20, 1967, as Universitas Kristen Djaja. UKRIDA was founded in 1967 under the GKI Synod of West Java. UKRIDA has three campuses and two teaching hospitals, with 5 faculties and 14 study programs, of which two study programs are new study programs, namely Applied Bachelor Optometry (the first and only one in Indonesia) & Diploma (D3) Nursing . Not only that, currently UKRIDA is also developing the concentration of Biomedical Engineering in the Electrical Engineering study program. All study programs have been accredited by BAN-PT. Ukrida also equips its students with soft skills programs to be ready to enter the career world.

== History ==
=== Founding and early history ===
On the initiative of several leaders of the West Java Indonesian Christian Church (GKI West Java Region) supported by Prof. Dr. G.A. Siwabessy (Minister of Health at the time) and Mrs. Rev. Rumambi-Kolopita (wife of the minister of information at the time), Djaya Christian University was established as a continuation of the schools under BPK Penabur (TK, SD, SMP, SMU) on January 20, 1967, with the Decree of the Director General of Higher Education Depdikbud RI No. 202/DPT/I/1970.

Due to the necessity to separate the management of basic, secondary, and general education from higher education, since November 22, 1990, the management of Ukrida was separated from BPK Penabur to the Christian Higher Education Foundation (YPTK) Krida Wacana.

To synchronize with the PTK Krida Wacana Foundation, the name of Djaya Christian University was officially changed on February 8, 1992, to Krida Wacana Christian University in accordance with the Decree of the Minister of Education and Culture of the Republic of Indonesia No. 0106/0/1992, while still using the acronym UKRIDA.

Teaching and learning activities since 1985 until now are at Campus I Tanjung Duren; previously held at Gunung Sahari Campus, Jl. Gunung Sahari 90A, Central Jakarta. UKRIDA continues to develop its campus by establishing Campus II UKRIDA at Jalan Canal Arjuna No. 6. Campus II has been used since August 2002, especially for the Faculty of Medicine and Health Sciences UKRIDA. The next development is Campus III at Wilcon Sentra Bisnis Blok A 6A/11, specifically for the Faculty of Economics and Business as well as the UKRIDA Course and Training Institute.

== Faculty ==
=== Diploma 3 ===
- Faculty of Medicine and Health Science
1. Nursing

=== Applied Bachelor ===
- Faculty of Medicine and Health Science
1. Optometry

=== Bachelor ===
- Faculty of Medicine and Health Science
1. Medical Science
- Faculty of Economics and Business
1. Management (Specialties: Digital Business, Fintech)
2. Accounting (Specialties: Tax for Digital Business, Contemporary Audit)
- Faculty of Engineering and Computer Science
1. Electric Engineering (Specialties: Intelligent Systems & Robotics, Biomedical Engineering)
2. Civil Engineering (Specialties: Infrastructure Design, Infrastructure Management)
3. Industrial Engineering (Specialties: Digital Supply Chain Management, Digital Product Design)
4. Informatics (Specialties: Intelligent Systems, Health Informatics)
5. Information System (Specialties: Full Stack Development, Business Intelligence & Data Science)
- Faculty of Psychology
1. Psychology
- Faculty of Social Science and Humanities
1. English Literature (Specialties: Creative Writing, Translation and Interpreting, Teaching English to Speakers of Other Languages)

=== Profession ===
- Faculty of Medicine and Health Science
1. Medical Doctor

=== Post-graduate schools ===
- Faculty of Economics and Business
1. Magister Management (Specialties: Marketing Management, Financial Management, Human Resources Management, School Management, Church Management, Hospital Management)
