= Mall Ciputra =

Coordinates: 6.168363°S 106.786750°E

Mal Ciputra

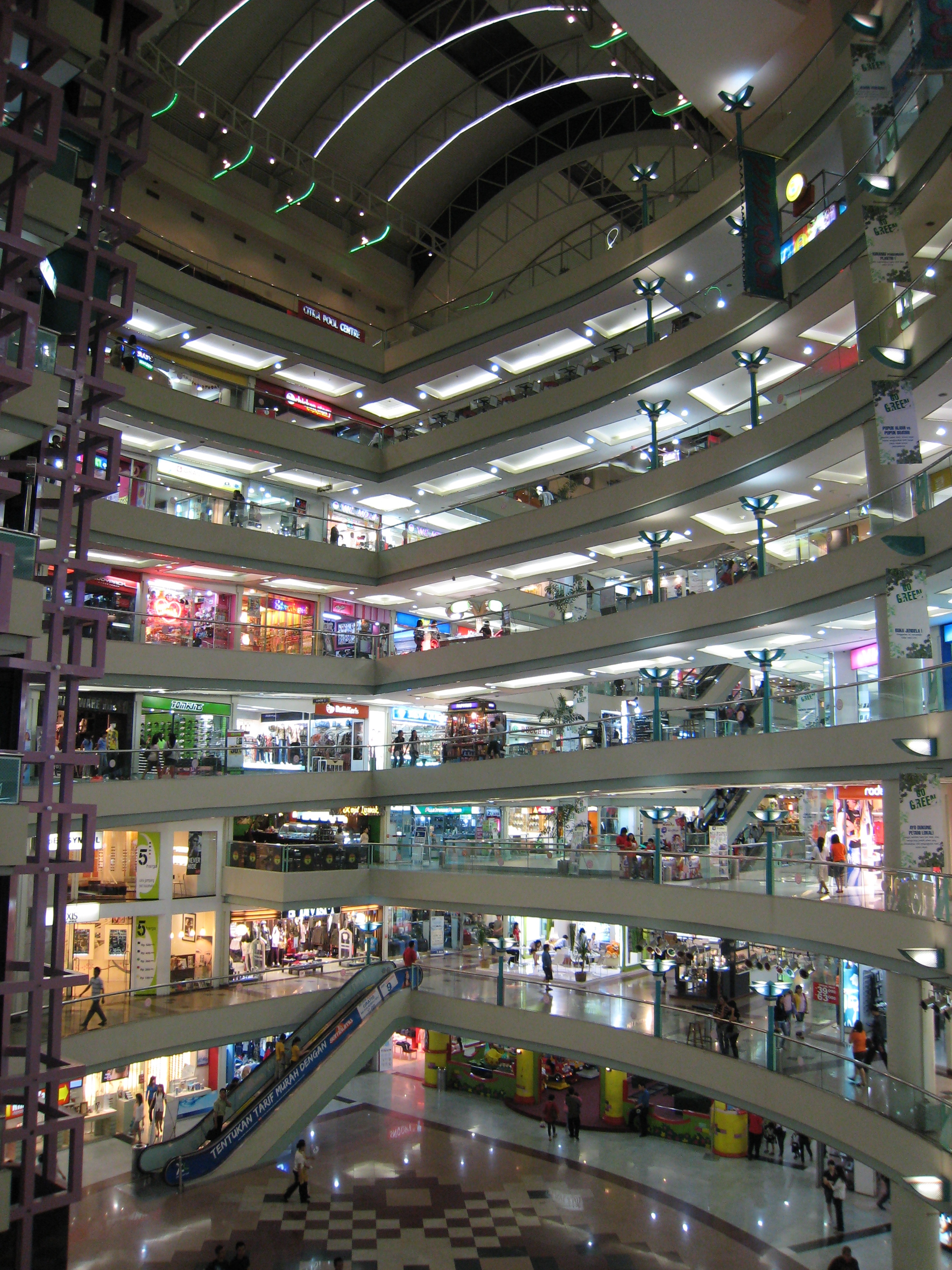
- Interior of the mall, 2008
- Location: Grogol Petamburan, West Jakarta, Indonesia
- Address: Jl. Arteri S.Parman
- Public transit: Grogol; Grogol Reformasi; Jelambar
- Website: www.ciputramall.com

Mall Ciputra (formerly Citraland Mall, abbreviated CL) is a shopping mall in Grogol Petamburan, West Jakarta, Indonesia. It was opened in February 1993.

In addition to branded shops, restaurants, and a department store, there is a supermarket, a cinema, a bookstore, a hotel, and a children's playground. The complex covers 4.1 hectares (10 acres) with the mall having 76,017 square metres (818,240 sq ft), of which 43,100 square metres (464,000 sq ft) is leasable mall floor space, located on five floors with an additional service basement. The mall has an open design which allows shoppes on all levels to view the center court.

During the May 1998 Riots, rioters attempting to break into the mall were blocked by an anti-riot police unit guarding the shopping center, a large clash ensues between the rioters and the police, the mall sustained no damage whatsoever.

In 2012, the mall experienced a major renovation.

== See also ==
- List of malls in Jakarta
