= Podomoro City =

Mixed superblock in Jakarta

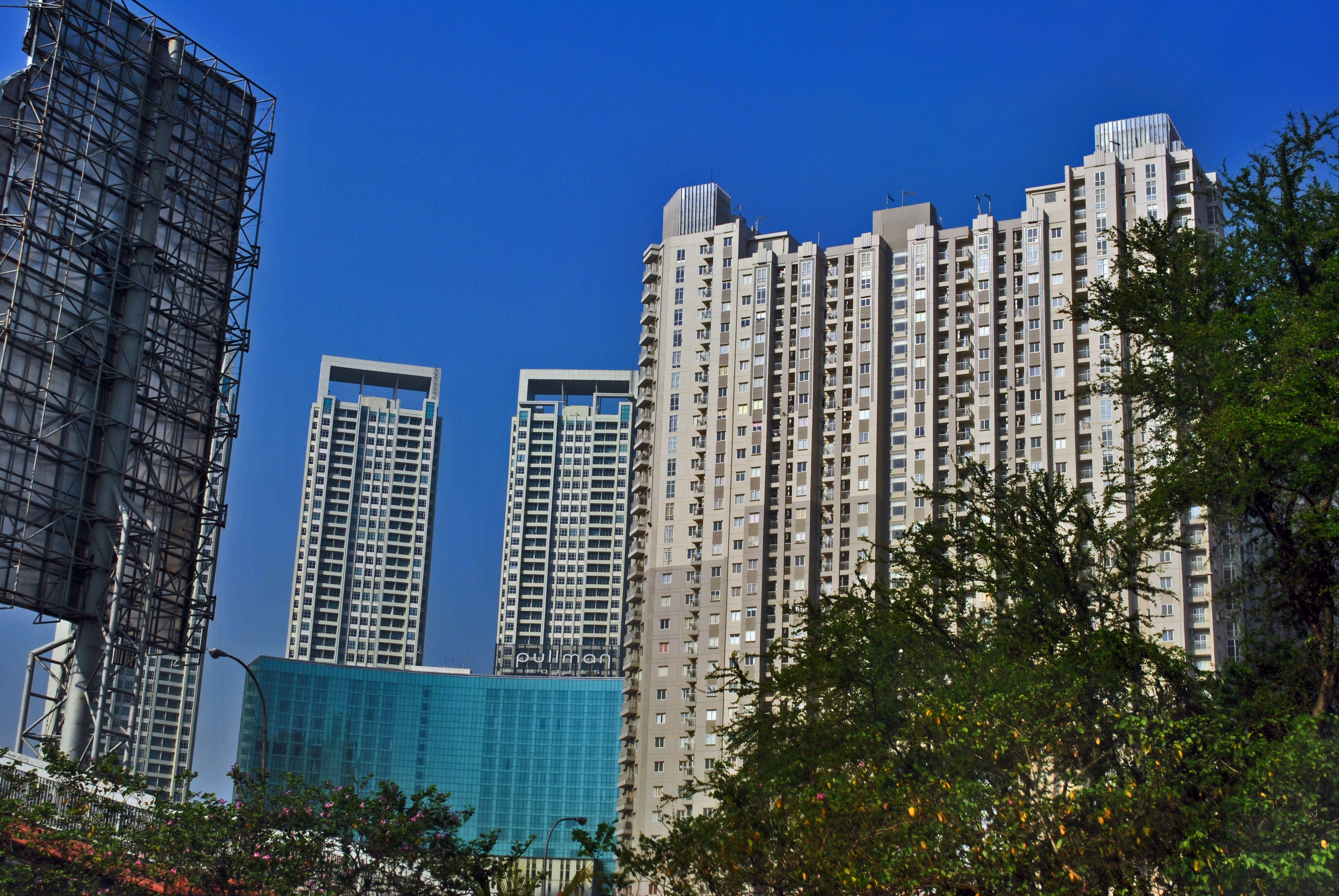
View of Podomoro City in 2012

Podomoro City is a mixed superblock at Grogol Petamburan in Jakarta, Indonesia. The integrated complex has a land area of 25 hectares with 12 residential tower, 155 shophouses, 2 shopping malls, one office tower, one shopping arcade & one 5 star hotel.

This superblock is developed by Agung Podomoro Land. Besides Central Park Jakarta mall, there is NEO SOHO mall, Podomoro University & Garden shopping arcade located within the complex. Other buildings in the complex are APL office Tower, Central Park Residences, Royal Mediterania Garden, Mediterania Garden, Pullman Hotel Central Park and SOHO Capital. NEO SOHO mall is connected directly to Central Park mall through SOHO Eco-Skywalk.

On September 13, 2025, it is announced that NEO SOHO will be renamed as Central Park 2 by November 22, 2025.

== See also ==
- List of tallest buildings in Jakarta
- List of shopping malls in Jakarta
