= West Jakarta =

Administrative city in Jakarta, Indonesia

Coordinates: 6°10′06″S 106°45′32″E

West Jakarta Jakarta Barat
- Administrative city
- Administrative City of West Jakarta; Kota Administrasi Jakarta Barat

Other transcription(s)
  - Betawi: Jakartè Belah Kulon
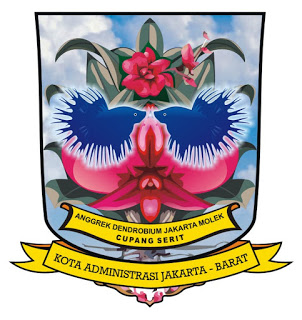
- Seal
- Motto: Kampung Kite Kalo Bukan Kite Nyang Ngurusin Siape Lagi (Betawi) "Our homeland, if it isn't us who maintain it, who else?"
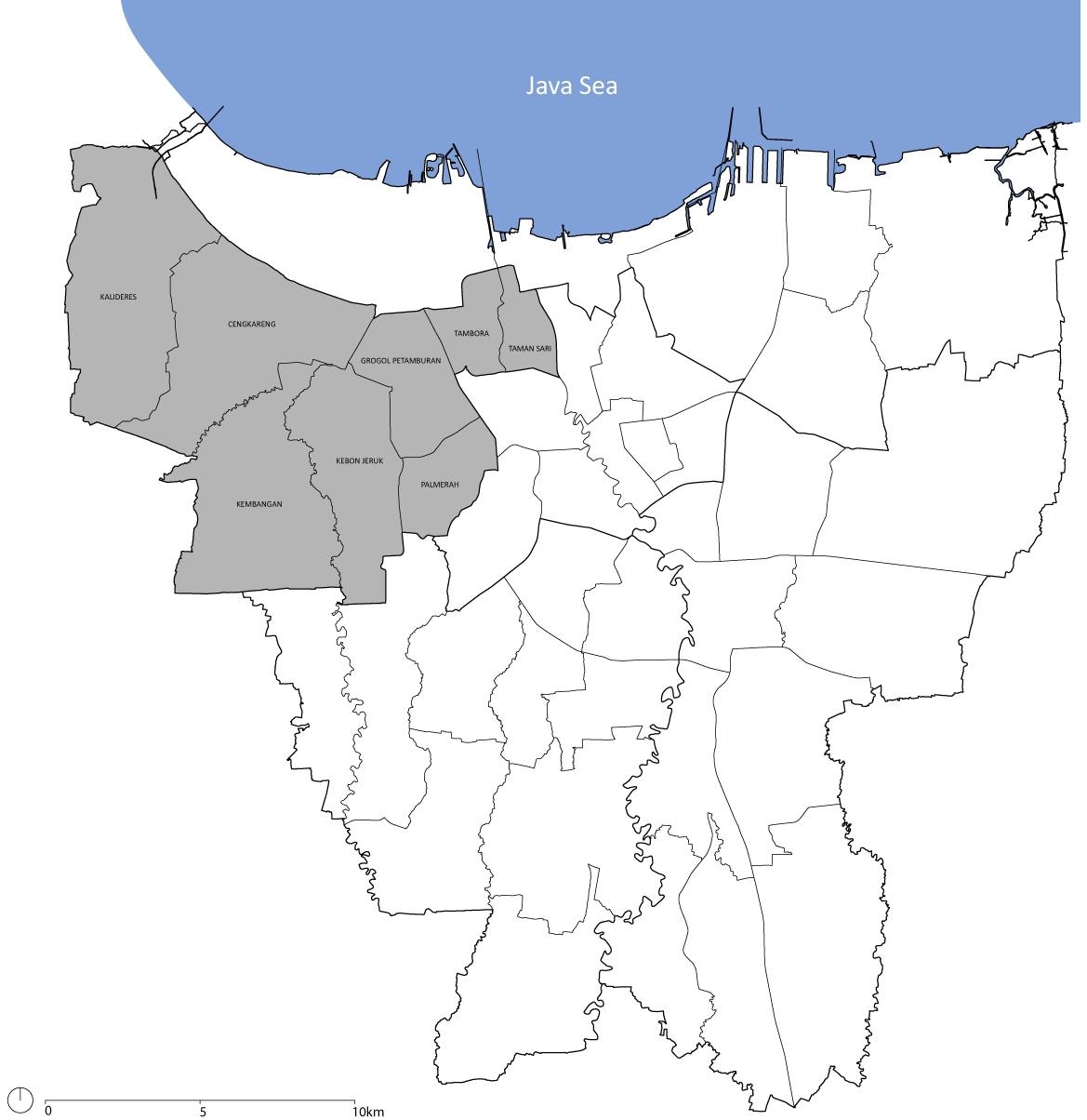
- Country: Indonesia
- Special Region: Jakarta

Government
  - Mayor: Iin Mutmainnah
  - Deputy Mayor: Ali Murthadho

Area
  - Total: 129.54 km^{2} (50.02 sq mi)

Population (mid 2025 estimate)
  - Total: 2,525,856
  - Density: 19,499/km^{2} (50,501/sq mi)
- Time zone: UTC+7 (WIB)
- Vehicle registration: B xxxx Bxx
- HDI (2024): ▲0.836 (14th) very high
- Website: barat.jakarta.go.id

West Jakarta (Indonesian: Jakarta Barat; Betawi: Jakarté Bèkulon), abbreviated as Jakbar, is one of the five administrative cities of the Special Capital Region of Jakarta, Indonesia. West Jakarta is not self-governed and does not have a city council, hence it is not classified as a proper municipality. It had a population of 2,281,945 at the 2010 Census and 2,434,511 at the 2020 Census; the official estimate as at mid 2025 was 2,525,856 (comprising 1,270,576 males and 1,255,280 females). The administrative center of West Jakarta is at Puri Kembangan.

West Jakarta is bordered by Tangerang Regency and North Jakarta to the north, Central Jakarta to the east, South Jakarta to the south, and Tangerang city to the west.

== History ==
West Jakarta is famous for its Dutch colonial relics such as Town Hall Building (now Jakarta History Museum in Jakarta Old Town), Chinatown (Glodok) and also a number of old churches, mosques, and fortresses of early Dutch colonization in Batavia at that time.

== Administrative districts ==
West Jakarta Administrative City (Kota Administrasi Jakarta Barat) is subdivided into eight districts (kecamatan), listed below with their areas and their populations at the 2010 Census and 2020 Census, together with the official estimates as at mid 2025: The table also includes the number of administrative villages in each district (all classed as urban kelurahan), together with their names and post codes.

Kode Wilayah	Name of District (kecamatan)	Area in km^{2}	Pop'n Census 2010	Pop'n Census 2020	Pop'n Estimate mid 2025	Pop'n density mid 2025 (/km^{2})	No. of villages	Villages (kelurahan) (with their Post codes)
31.73.08	Kembangan	24.16	271,985	288,768	308,493	12,769	6	Joglo (11640), Kembangan Selatan (11610), Kembangan Utara (11610), Meruya Selatan (11650), Meruya Utara (11620), Srengseng (11630)
31.73.05	Kebon Jeruk	17.98	333,303	341,938	358,854	19,959	7	Duri Kepa (11510), Kebon Jeruk (11530), Kedoya Selatan (11520), Kedoya Utara (11520), Kelapa Dua (11550), Sukabumi Selatan (11560), Sukabumi Utara (11540)
31.73.07	Palmerah	7.51	198,721	217,310	222,178	29,584	6	Jatipulo (11430), Kemanggisan (11480), Kota Bambu Selatan (11420), Kota Bambu Utara (11420), Palmerah (11480), Slipi (11410)
31.73.02	Grogol Petamburan	9.99	222,338	228,669	226,069	22,630	7	Grogol (11450), Jelambar Baru (11460), Jelambar (11460), Tanjung Duren Selatan (11470), Tanjung Duren Utara (11470), Tomang (11440), Wijaya Kusuma (11460)
31.73.04	Tambora	5.40	236,974	256,060	252,941	46,841	11	Angke (11330), Duri Selatan (11270), Duri Utara (11270), Jembatan Besi (11320), Jembatan Lima (11250), Kali Anyar (11310), Krendang (11260), Pekojan (11240), Roa Malaka (11230), Tambora (11220), Tanah Sereal (11210)
31.73.03	Taman Sari	7.73	109,556	119,509	120,531	15,593	8	Glodok (11120), Keagungan (11130), Krukut (11140), Mangga Besar (11180), Maphar (11160), Pinangsia (11110), Taman Sari (11150), Tangki (11170)
31.73.01	Cengkareng	26.54	513,920	551,682	575,401	21,681	6	Cengkareng Barat (11730), Cengkareng Timur (11730), Duri Kosambi (11750), Kapuk (11720), Kedaung Kali Angke (11710), Rawa Buaya (11740)
31.73.06	Kalideres	30.23	395,148	430,575	461,389	15,263	5	Kalideres (11840), Kamal (11810), Pegadungan (11830), Semanan (11850), Tegal Alur (11820)
	Totals	129.54	2,281,945	2,434,511	2,525,856	19,499	56	

== Economy ==
After South Jakarta, West Jakarta is now designed to become a new business district for the Jakarta area and beyond. Particularly in Kembangan District, malls, entertainment centers, shopping centers, office centers, hospitals and schools have been recently built. This area has become a strategic area because it is passed by the circuit of the Jakarta Outer Ring Road (Jalan Lingkar Luar Jakarta).

== High Rise Superblock Buildings ==
West Jakarta is one of the most densely populated areas for high-rise living in Indonesia. The skyline is dominated by several massive "superblocks" (integrated complexes of malls, offices and apartments). Some of the include:

- The Podomoro City Superblock. Arguably the most famous high-rise cluster in West Jakarta, directly connected to Central Park 1 & Central Park 2 Mall
- The St. Moritz and Puri Indah Area. Featuring the St. Moritz Penthouses & Residences, a complex consisting of several towers integrated with Lippo Mall Puri
- Taman Anggrek Residences. Located behind the famous Mall Taman Anggrek.

== Education ==
=== School system ===
Like the rest of the city, public school system are available in West Jakarta. State schools such as SDN 01, SDN 03, SMPN 45, SMPN 169, SMPN 22, SMPN 32, SMAN 57, SMAN 65 and many more are located at West Jakarta. Private schools, that may be based on religion, such as Christian-based Bukit Sion International School, Springfield International School, IPEKA Schools, BPK Penabur Schools, and Islamic-based school such as Al-Azhar are also located on West Jakarta.

=== Colleges and universities ===
West Jakarta is a home to numerous college and universities, such as Bina Nusantara University, Mercu Buana University, Trisakti University, Tarumanagara University, Podomoro University, Universitas Kristen Krida Wacana, and many more. The Telkom Institute of Technology Jakarta, a private university, was established in 2021 (formerly Jakarta Telkom Academy - 2002).

== Tourism ==
=== Museums ===
As Jakarta Old Town is located in West Jakarta, West Jakarta boosts some of the most famous museums of Jakarta such as Jakarta History Museum, Wayang Museum, Museum of Textile Jakarta, and Museum Bank Indonesia. Recently, The Museum of Modern and Contemporary Art in Nusantara (MACAN) has also opened in West Jakarta.

=== Temple ===
- Shri Sanathana Dharma Aalayam (Tamil: ஸ்ரீ சனாதன தர்ம ஆலயம்ஸ்), first Dravidian architecture Hindu Temple in Jakarta

=== Shopping malls ===
- Central Park 1 and 2 Jakarta
- City Walk Gajah Mada
- Grand Paragon Mall
- Green Sedayu Mall
- Mal Ciputra Jakarta
- Mall Taman Anggrek
- Mall Puri Indah
- Lippo Mall Puri and PX Pavilion @ St. Moritz
- Lokasari Square
- Mall Daan Mogot
- Mall Taman Palem
- Season City
- Plaza Slipi Jaya

== Gallery ==
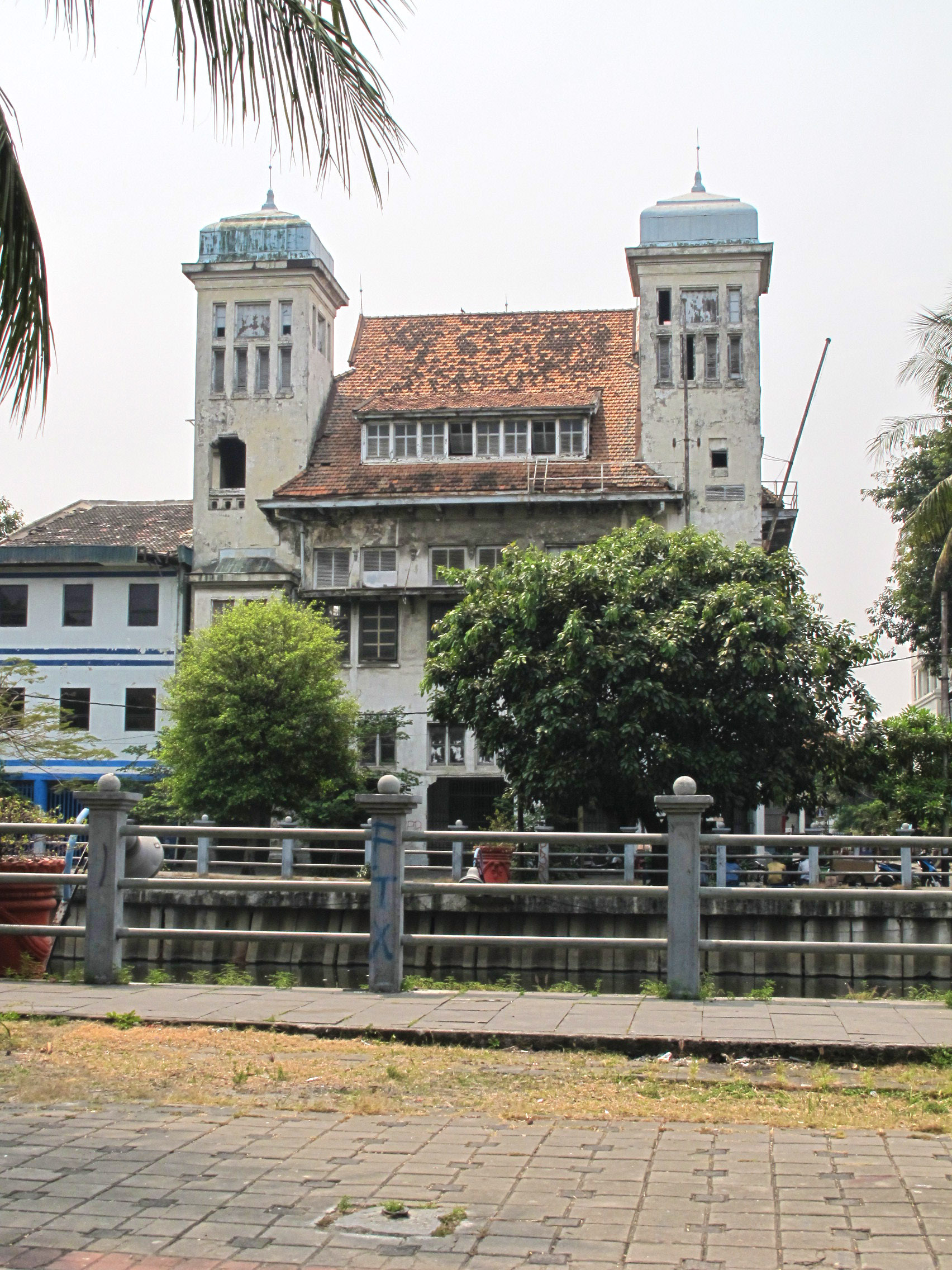

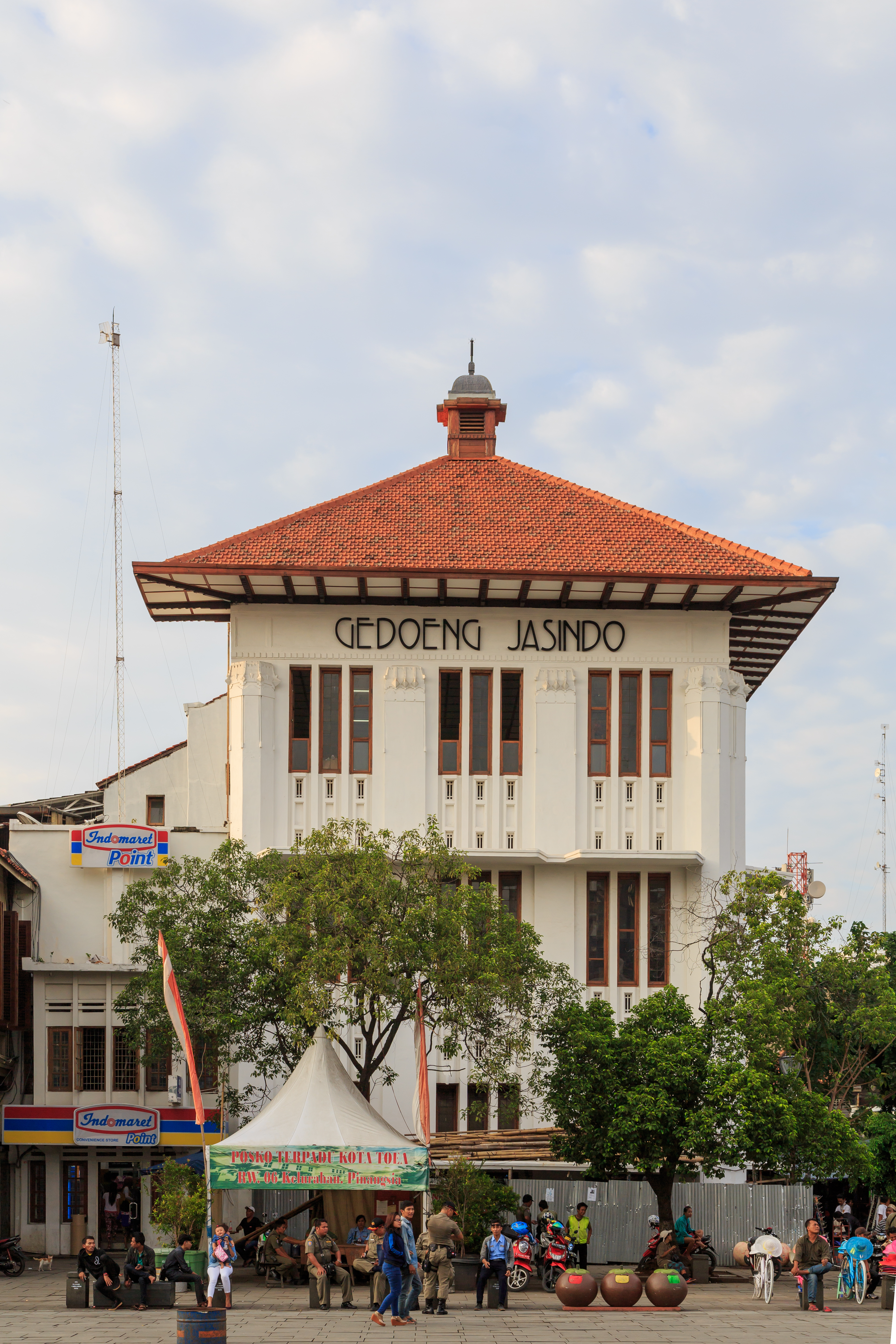

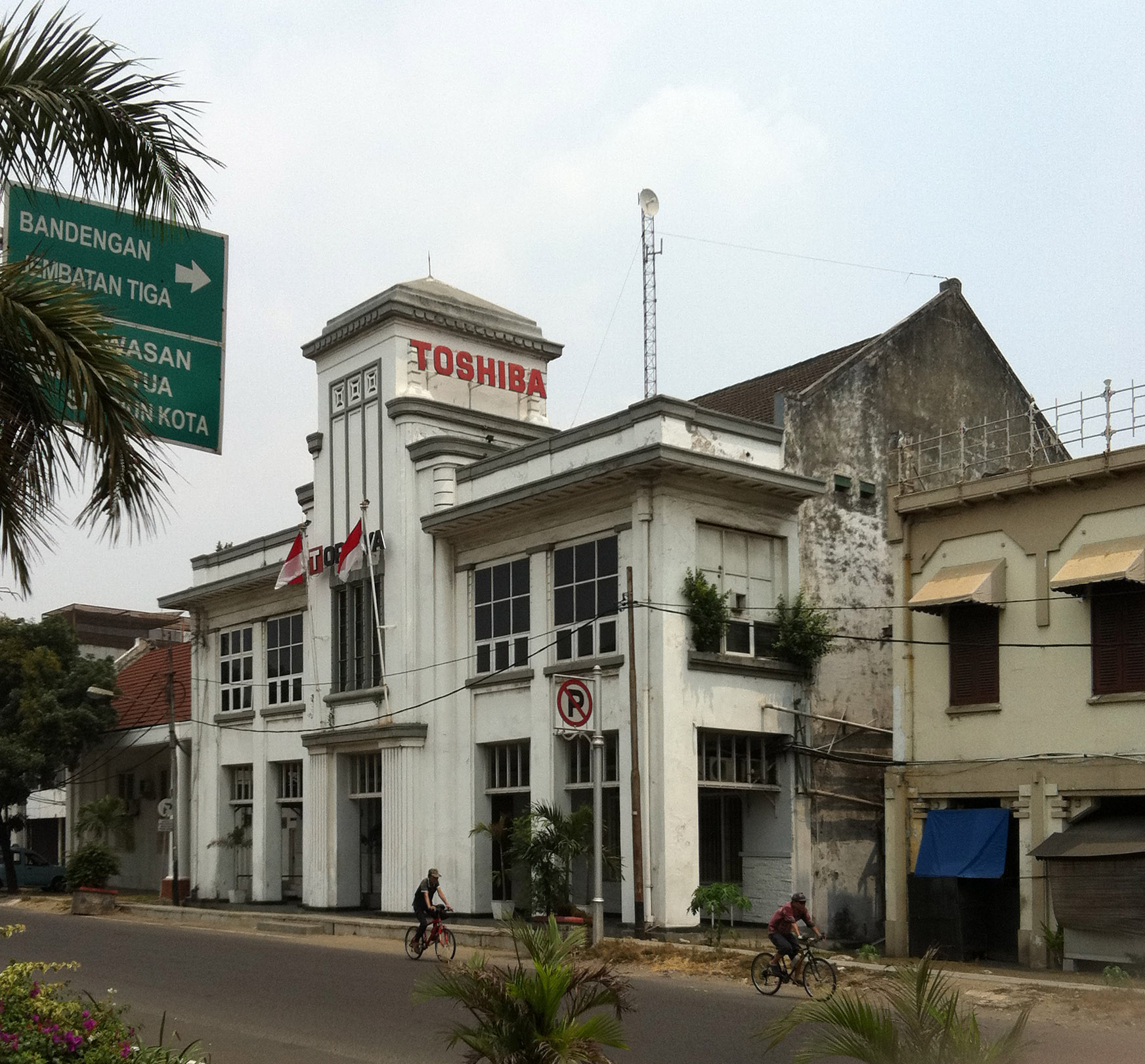

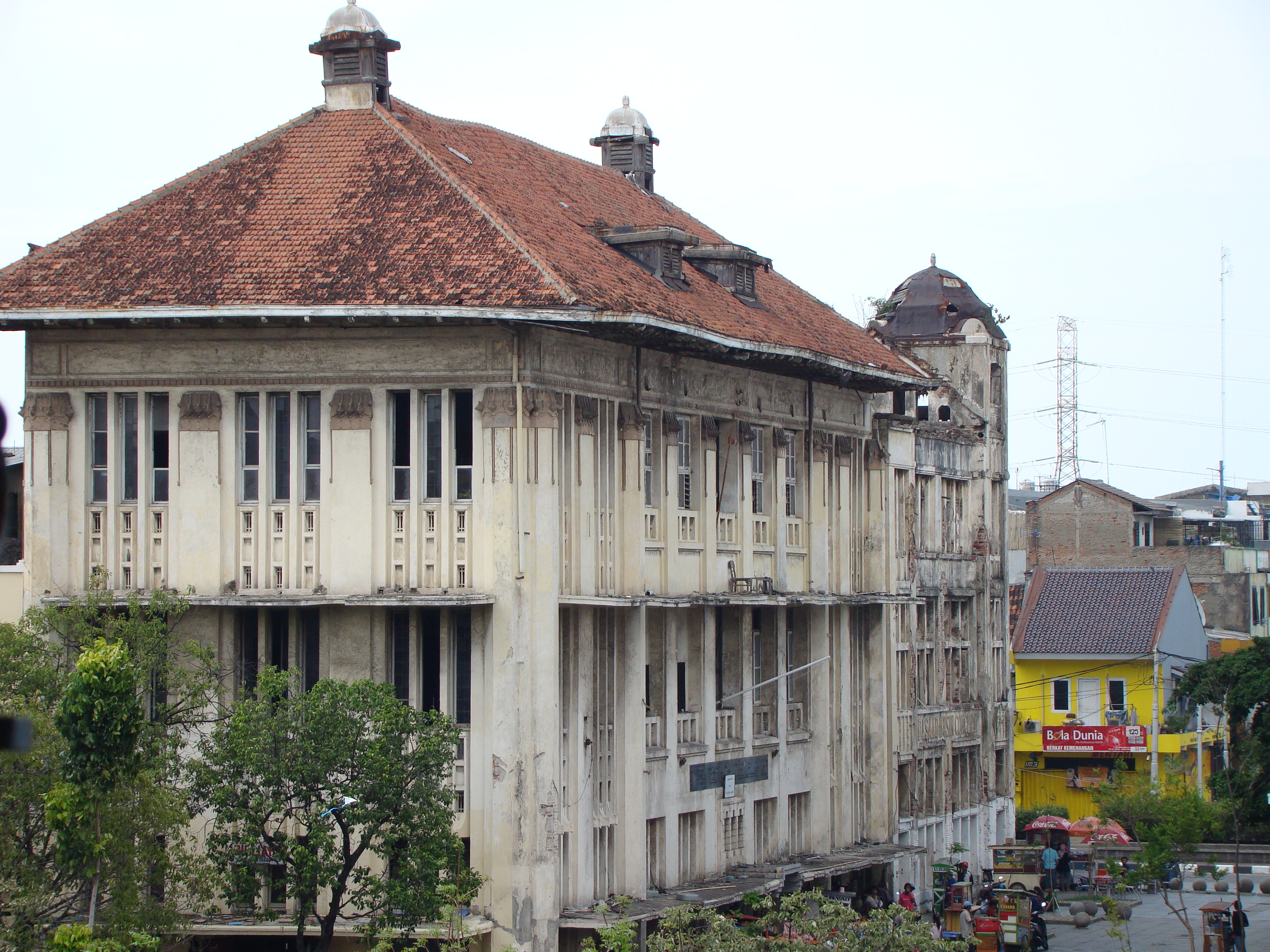

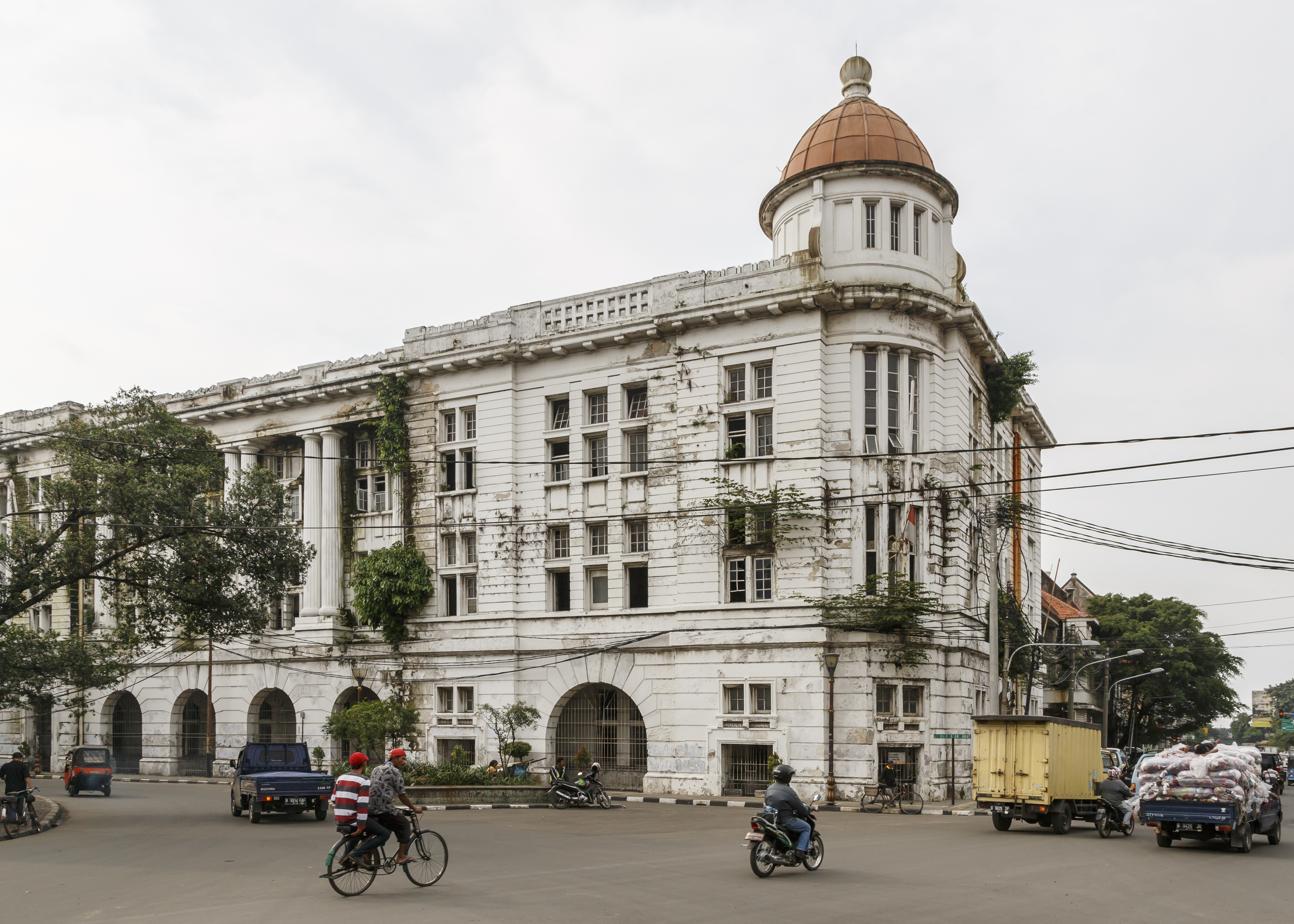

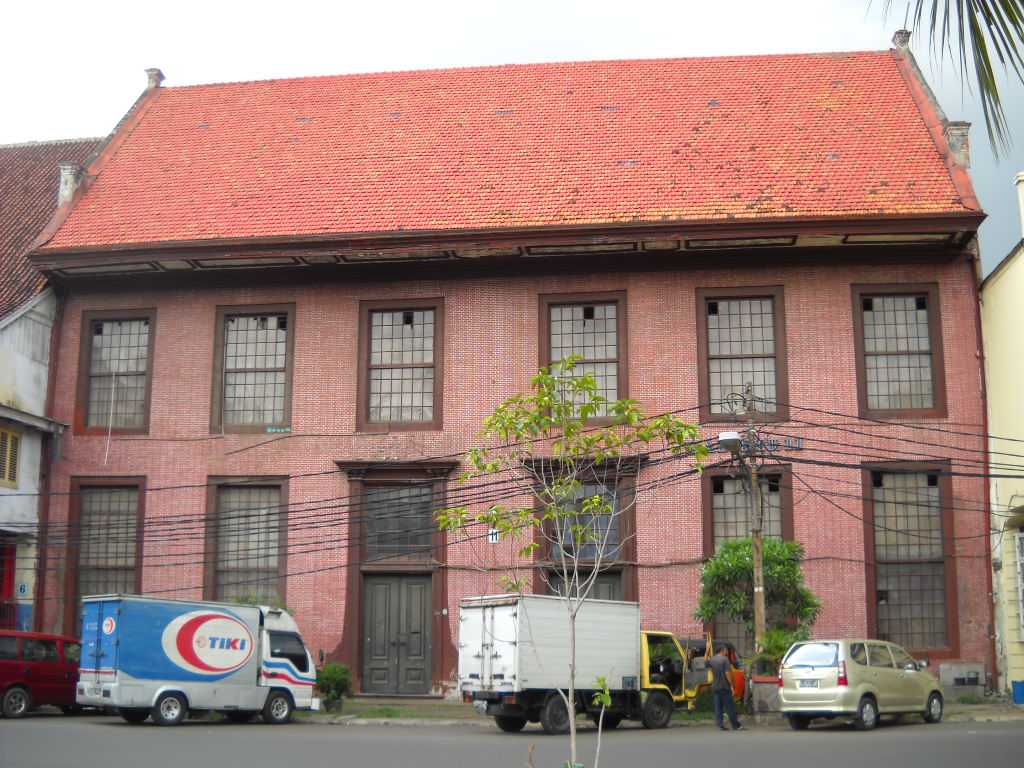

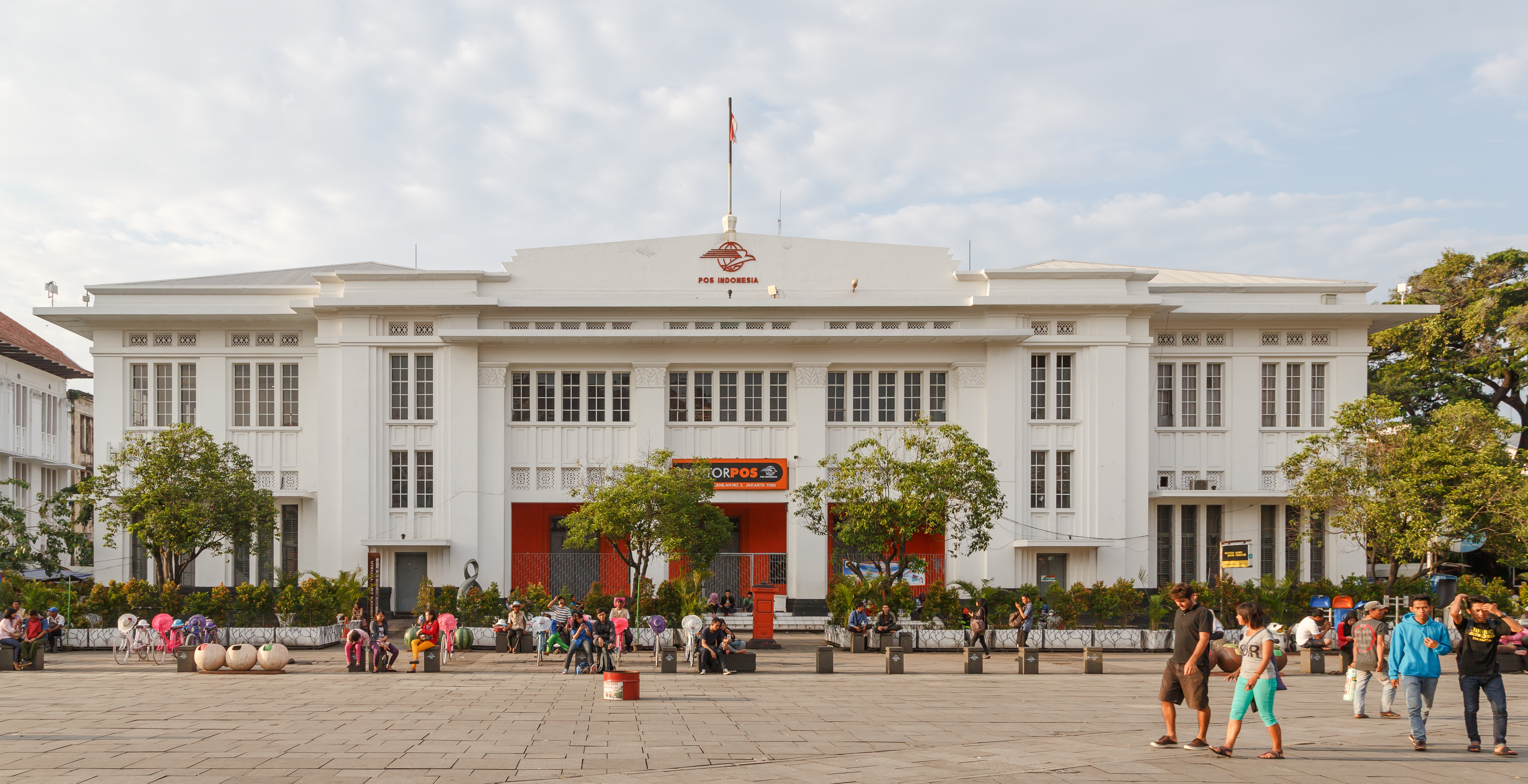

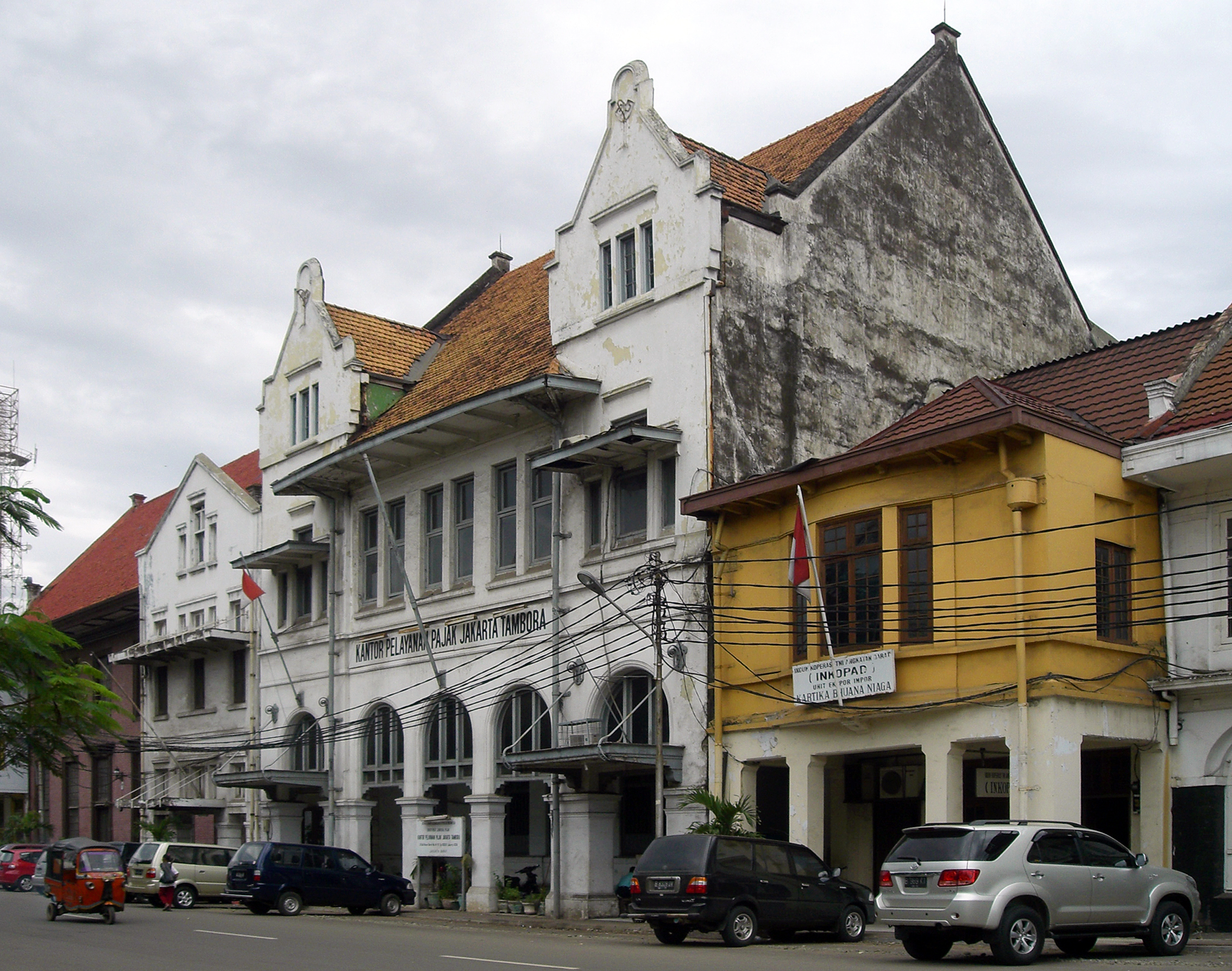

== Transport ==
- Trans Jakarta
- KRL Commuter Line Tangerang Line | Cikarang Line | Bogor Line Jakarta Kota - Bogor
- Airport Railink | Airport Rail Link
- MRT Jakarta (U/C) North-South Line Bundaran HI - Kota
- MRT Jakarta (Planned) East West Line Cikarang - Balaraja
