= FX Sudirman =

Shopping mall in Jakarta

fX Sudirman

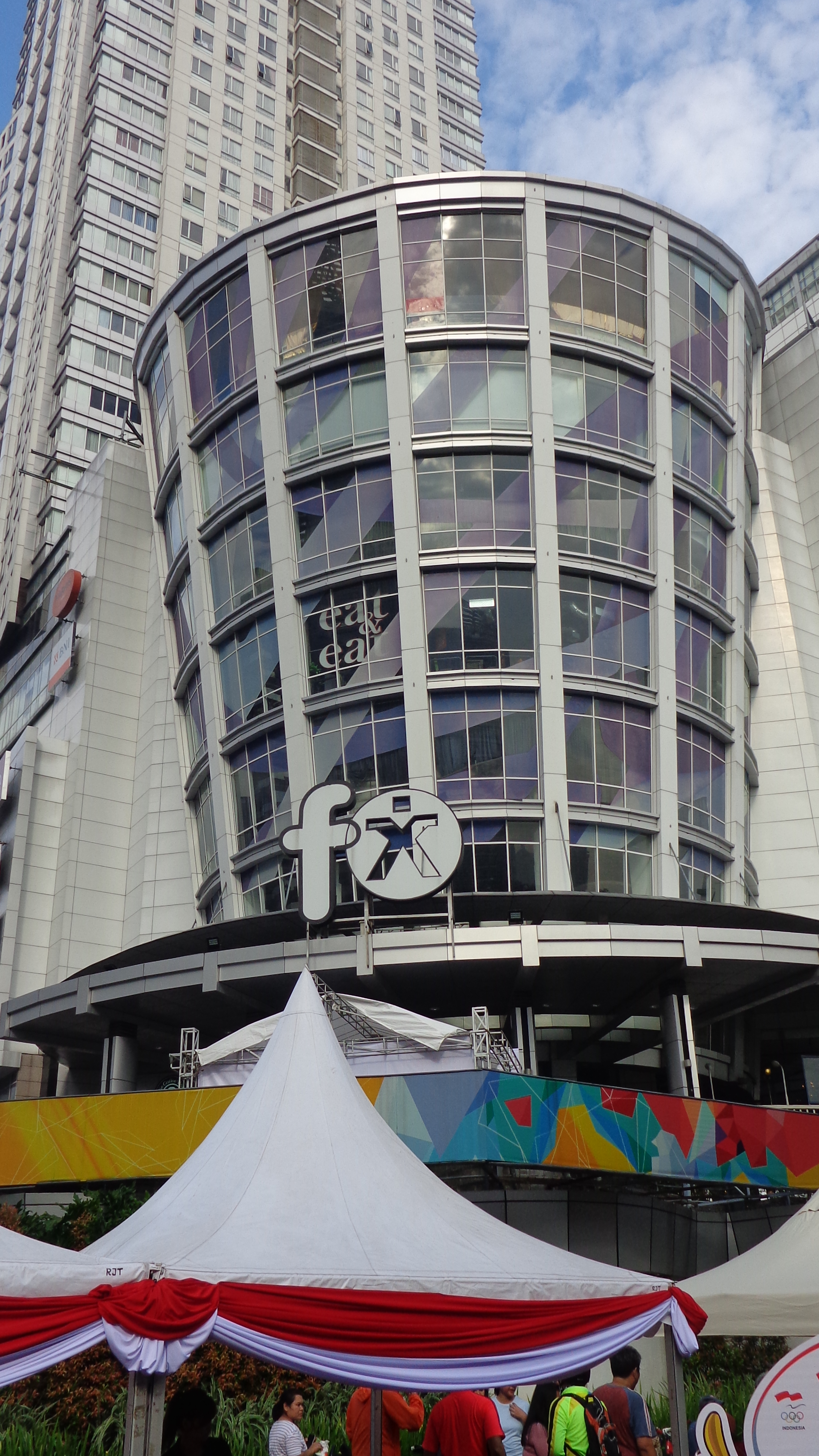
- Location: Gelora, Tanah Abang, Central Jakarta
- Coordinates: 6.224516°S 106.803833°E
- Address: Jalan Jenderal Sudirman
- Opened: July 21, 2008
- Public transit: Senayan Mastercard; Senayan Bank Jakarta
- Website: fxsudirman.com

fX Sudirman previously known as Lifestyle X'nter (fX), is a shopping mall in Jakarta, Indonesia. The mall is spread across the first eight floors of the building and includes fashion, food, beauty, entertainment, and business meeting facilities. It stands on land operated by the Gelora Bung Karno Complex Management Center, which also operates the nearby Gelora Bung Karno Sports Complex.

The building also contains apartments above the eighth level of the mall, including hotel accommodation by Harris Hotel. The tenth floor contains a gym, pool, and tennis court. The complex, along with the mall and apartment tower, was known as Sudirman Place from 2006 to 2008. The apartment tower is 213 m (699 ft) tall and one of the tallest apartment towers in Jakarta. The apartment tower was known as The Pinnacle from 2006 to 2008 and is now named FX Residence.

== History ==
fX Sudirman was first established and officially opened in February 2006 as Sudirman Place by PT Aneka Bina Lestari, who manages it with a concept that melds family mall and boutique mall. Although there were already two large malls nearby (Senayan City and Plaza Senayan), the owner was confident that the mall would be very successful considering its strategic location, being easily reached by patrons arriving from several directions.

When it was first established, around a hundred tenants agreed to open in the new mall; however, less than ten tenants opened at launch, namely Nichols Edward, Bali Deli, Zuma, and Starbucks. Most tenants canceled their agreements to open in the mall or closed soon after opening because the mall suffered from a lack of visitors. According to Bagus Y. Prastowo, GM Advertising and Promotion FX Plaza, the family mall concept with 100 tenants would not work because its size – 30,000 m^{2} (320,000 sq ft) – was too small compared to nearby malls with 150,000 m^{2} (1,600,000 sq ft) of space.

Sudirman Place officially closed in November 2006. The building management was then taken over by PT Plaza Lifestyle Prima (Group PT Plaza Indonesia Realty Tbk/PIR), who saw potential based on its location, provided it could be positioned in the market as complementary to the malls nearby. After three months of comparative study, a further six months was taken to create the new concept for the mall. The new management used overseas building designer Denton Corker Marshall and its architect Budiman (Principal Architect), the same company who designed Plaza eX. After actively promoting it creatively and intensively, Henny Udi, Marketing Director from PT Plaza Lifestyle Prima as the sister company of Plaza Indonesia Realty (PIR), managed to increase the tenant occupancy rate from 25 percent to 97 percent.

It reopened in July 2008 as fX Plaza. The previous tenants were encouraged to stay with one condition: that they should follow the "new concept," or their contracts were settled "peacefully," according to Henny Udi, Leasing Director. When it first opened, the new concept managed to attract five thousand visitors daily to the mall. The mall provided 20 Mbit/s free wifi on every floor with over 200 access points. and Atmosfear Slide was added to the mall. The slide was designed by Legacy Entertainment.

In June 2011, the apartment was taken over by Tauzia Hotel Management (now part of The Ascott Limited) and operated its seventh hotel chain (Harris Hotel) and introduced it as "Harris Suites" inside fX Sudirman. It has 88 rooms and uses an already established facility for the apartment.

In July 2012, the mall celebrated four years since the reopening.

== Land dispute ==
The fX building is part of a land dispute surrounding Gelora Bung Karno area. According to Hakam Naja as the Head of Indonesia Country Asset Working Committee, the funding received from fX mall is supposed to go to the country's asset instead of National Sports Committee of Indonesia (KONI).

== Bomb threat ==
In November 2008, the building received a bomb threat sent to Indonesian police SMS number 1717, U.S. Embassy, and Australian Embassy.

== fPod ==
When it reopened in mid-2008, the building's "new concept" also offered 11 closed meeting places known as fPod. Each fPod has a different design, by 10 Indonesian national and international architects, including Ridwan Kamil, Leonard Theosabatra, Alvin Tjitowirjo, Willis Kusuma, and Avianti Armand. fPods include audio-visual equipment, WiFi, and songs for guests wishing to use the fPod for karaoke.

== Events ==
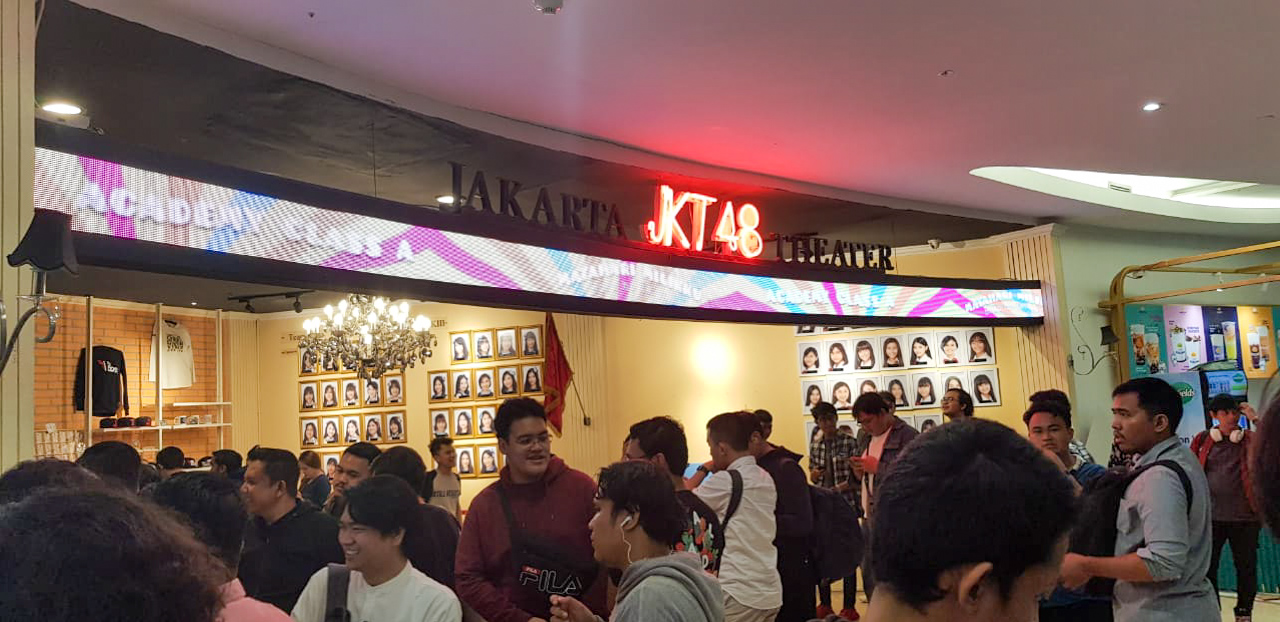
JKT48 Theater, photographed 28 February 2020

fX was the venue for Social Media Festival (SocMedFest) 22–24 September 2011, which attracted 3,000 attendees, making it the largest social media festival in Indonesia, and featured a broad range of organisations using social media effectively, from commercial enterprise to non-profit humanitarian purposes.

From 8 September 2012, the idol group JKT48 has performed regularly in their theater, which is set on its fourth floor.
