= Senayan, Kebayoran Baru =

Senayan
- Administrative village
- Interactive map of Senayan
- Country: Indonesia
- Province: DKI Jakarta
- Administrative city: South Jakarta
- District: Kebayoran Baru

Senayan is an administrative village (kelurahan in Indonesian) at Kebayoran Baru subdistrict, South Jakarta, Indonesia. The post code is 12190.

== Boundaries ==
The borders of Senayan are:

- Semanggi Flyover in the north
- General Sudirman Street in Gelora administrative village, Tanah Abang subdistrict, Central Jakarta in the west
- General Gatot Subroto Street in Karet Semanggi administrative village, Setiabudi subdistrict in the east
- Selong administrative village in the south.

Despite the name used, the Gelora Bung Karno sports complex - which is also known as Gelora Senayan Sports Complex, is not within the boundaries of this administrative village, not even in South Jakarta. The sports complex lies within the up-north adjacent Gelora administrative village, which is under the administrative municipality of Central Jakarta.

== Highlights ==
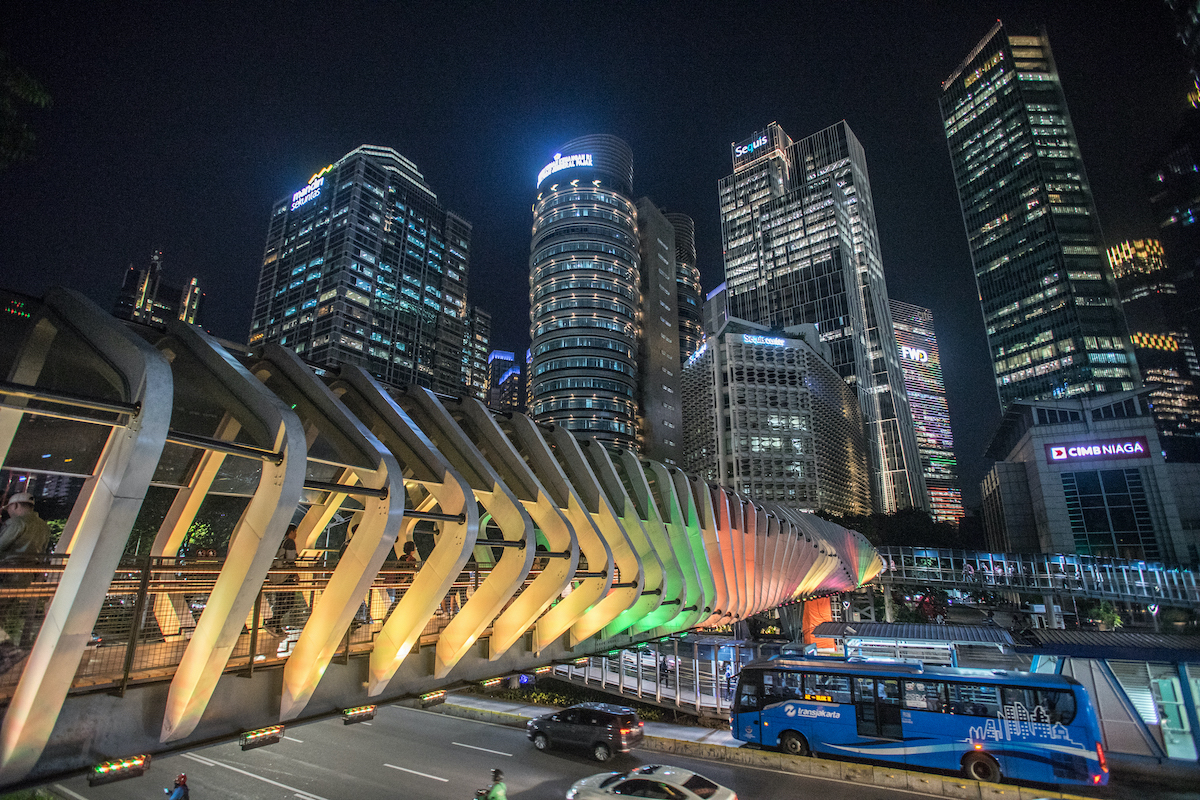
SCBD is the Central Business District in Jakarta

Among the important national as well as regional landmarks located in this area are:

- Headquarters of Greater Jakarta Metropolitan Regional Police
- The office of the Indonesian Investment Coordinating Board
- Wisma Danantara, headquarters of the Danantara sovereign wealth fund agency
- Headquarters office of the Directorate General of Taxation - the tax office of Indonesia
- The SCBD - one of Jakarta's prominent business and commercial centers
- Menara Mandiri, the headquarters office of Bank Mandiri - the largest bank in Indonesia in terms of assets, loans and deposits
- The Indonesia Stock Exchange (BEI) building is located in this area within the SCBD.
- The Widya Chandra residential complex, in which many Indonesian government ministers have their official residences, is also located in this area.

== Toponym ==
The name Senayan is derived from the word Wangsanayan, "land of Wangsanaya". According to De Haan, Wangsanaya was a lieutenant from Bali who lived at the end of the 17th century, but little is known about him. As time progressed, Wangsanayan was shortened to Senayan.

== See also ==
- Plaza Senayan, a shopping mall
- Senayan City, a mixed-use development
- Senayan MRT station
