= Gelora Bung Karno Sports Complex =

Indonesian sports venue

Bung Karno Sports Complex
- Gelanggang Olahraga Bung Karno

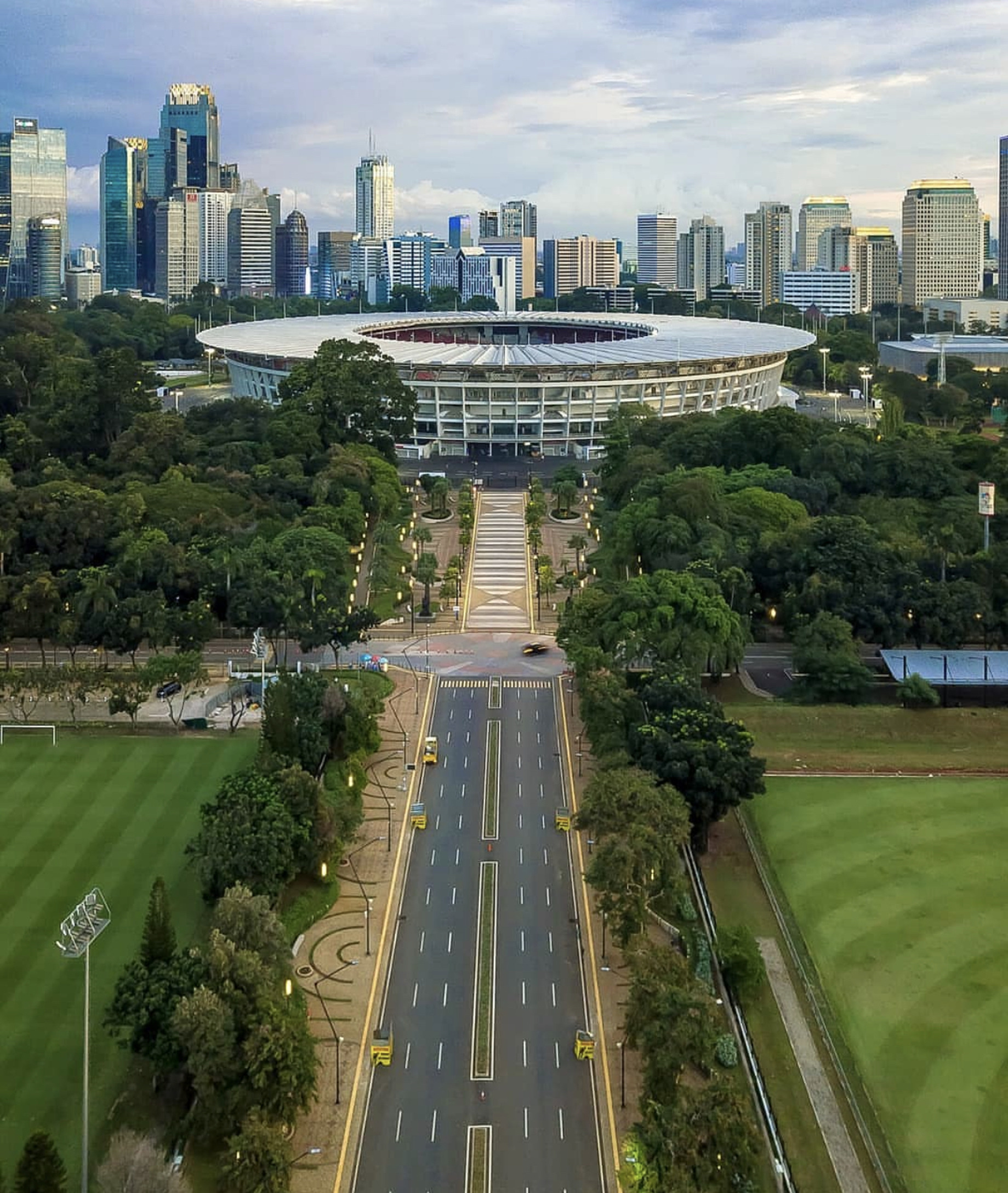
- The main stadium complex in 2023
- Interactive map of Bung Karno Sports Complex
- Full name: Gelanggang Olahraga Bung Karno
- Former names: Asian Games Complex (until 24 September 1962); Gelanggang Olahraga Senayan (1969 – 17 January 2001)
- Location: Gelora, Central Jakarta, Indonesia
- Coordinates: 6°13′6.88″S 106°48′9.04″E
- Owner: Government of Indonesia (Note: Via Ministry of the State Secretariat)
- Operator: Pusat Pengelolaan Komplek Gelora Bung Karno (PPKGBK, Gelora Bung Karno Complex Management Center)
- Main venue: Gelora Bung Karno Main Stadium; Capacity: 77,193
- Facilities: Madya Stadium; Aquatic Stadium; Sports Palace; Indonesia Arena; Tennis Indoor; Tennis Outdoor; Baseball Stadium; Softball Field; Rugby Field; Archery Field; Squash Stadium
- Public transit: Istora Mandiri; Palmerah; Senayan Bank Jakarta; Gerbang Pemuda

Construction
- Groundbreaking: 8 February 1960
- Built: 1960–1962
- Opened: 1961–1962
- Renovated: 2016–2018
- Closed: 2016–2018
- Reopened: 2018
- Cost: $12,500,000 (1958); Rp3,5 trillion (renovation)

Website
- gbk.id

The Bung Karno Sports Complex (Indonesian: Gelanggang Olahraga Bung Karno), better known as Gelora Bung Karno; formerly named the Asian Games Complex (Indonesian: Kompleks Asian Games) and the Senayan Sports Complex (Indonesian: Kompleks Olahraga Senayan) from 1969 to 2001, is a sports complex located in Gelora, Central Jakarta, bordering the Senayan, South Jakarta because of its large location. This sports complex consists of a main stadium, secondary stadium, two main indoor gymnasiums known as the Sports Palace (Istora) and the Indonesia Arena, football fields, aquatic stadium, tennis stadiums (indoor and outdoor), hockey, baseball and archery fields, and other gymnasiums.

Originally built with substantial Soviet assistance, this sports complex was a brain child of Sukarno, the first President of Indonesia, in order to host the 1962 Asian Games. It was built in 1960, and underwent major renovation for the 2018 Asian Games and Asian Para Games.

== History ==
After the Asian Games Federation declared Jakarta to host the 1962 Asian Games in 1958, the minimum requirement that was yet to be met by Jakarta was the availability of a multi-sport complex. In response to this, President Sukarno issued Presidential Decree No. 113/1959 dated 11 May 1959 about the establishment of the Asian Games Council of Indonesia (DAGI) led by Minister of Sports Maladi. Sukarno, as an architect and civil engineering graduate, proposed a location near M. H. Thamrin Boulevard and Menteng, namely the area of Karet, Pejompongan, or Dukuh Atas. Friedrich Silaban, a renowned architect who accompanied Sukarno to review the location by helicopter, disagreed with the selection of Dukuh Atas because he argued the construction of a sports complex in the center of the future downtown area will potentially create massive traffic congestion. Sukarno agreed and instead assigned the Senayan area with an area of approximately 300 hectares.

The first pole erection was done symbolically by Sukarno and Soviet First Deputy Premier Anastas Mikoyan on 8 February 1960. Construction of Istora was completed in May 1961. The secondary stadium, Swimming Stadium, and Tennis Stadium followed in December 1961. The main stadium was completed on 21 July 1962, a month before the games. The sports complex hosts a main stadium with a capacity of 77,193 seats, athletic stadium, football fields, aquatic stadium, tennis stadiums (indoor and outdoor), hockey, baseball and archery fields, and several indoor gymnasiums. Built over 279 hectares of land, it is the largest sports complex in Indonesia. The Gelora Bung Karno Stadium is the main building within this sports complex. The abbreviation Gelora also means "vigorous" (like the flame or ocean wave) in the Indonesian language. Other than hosting several sports facilities, the sports complex is also a popular place for people of Jakarta to do physical exercises; jogging, bicycling, aerobics, and calisthenics, especially during the weekend.

On 29 April 2025, the Indonesian sovereign wealth fund agency, Danantara, planned to take over the management of the GBK complex from the current manager, Ministry of State Secretariat. Danantara CEO Rosan Roeslani stated that the complex has a well prospect as "one of the largest state assets, but still limited in utilization and return on investment."

== Sporting events ==
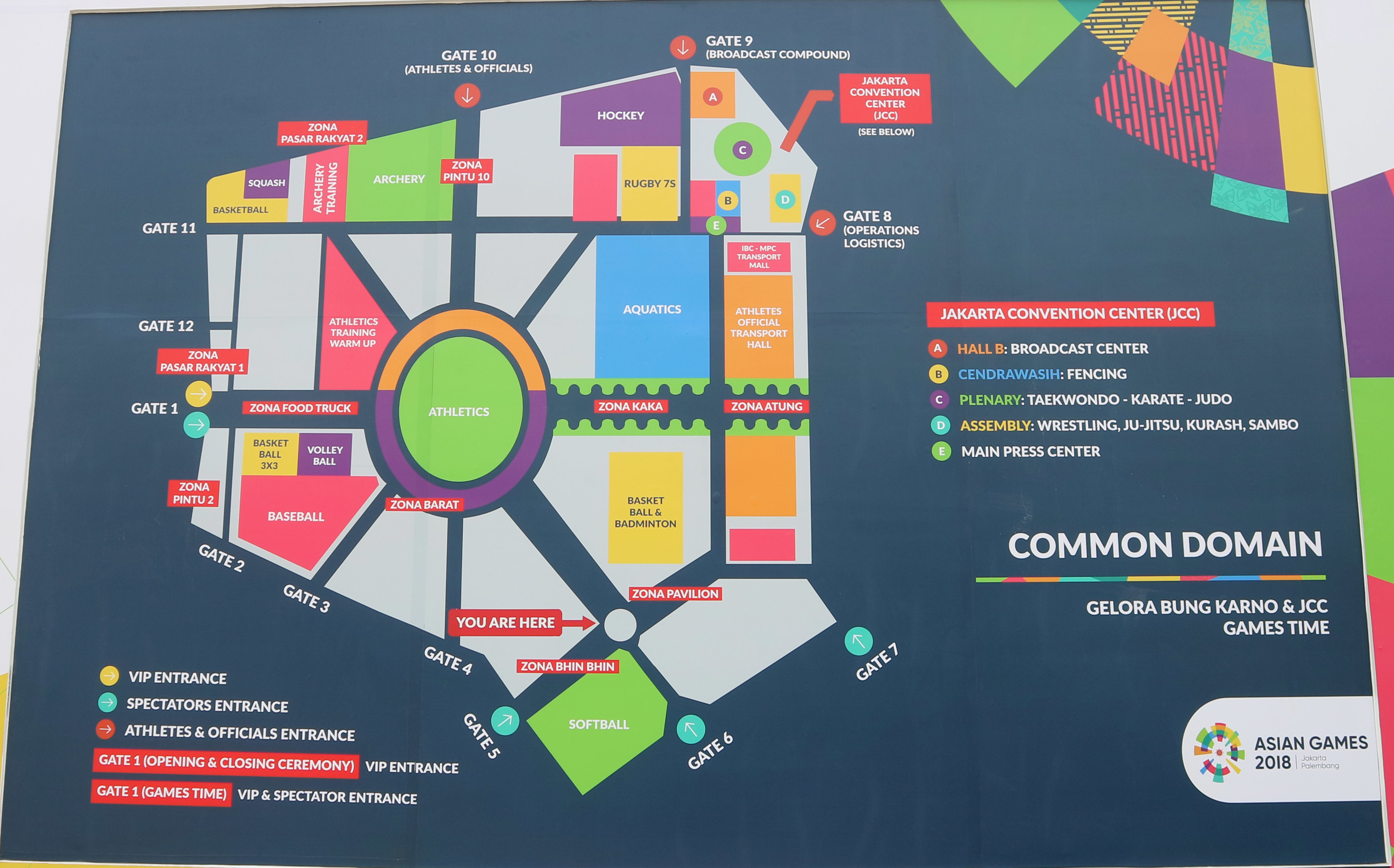
The map of the GBK during the 2018 Asian Games

For the first time, the sports complex was host fourth Asian Games in 1962. The main stadium hosted the 2007 AFC Asian Cup. Other competitions held there were several AFF Championship finals and domestic cup finals. The Istora hosted numbers of BWF World Championships, Sudirman Cup, Thomas Cup and Uber Cup badminton competitions. The tennis stadium hosted most of Indonesia's home matches at the Davis Cup and Fed Cup.

The sports complex hosted multi-event sport such as Pekan Olahraga Nasional (PON, National Sports Week) and Southeast Asian Games (SEA Games). The complex hosted the PON seven times between 1973 and 1996. The complex hosted the SEA Games in 1979, 1987, 1997 and 2011; the latter was co-hosted with Jakabaring Sport City complex in Palembang. It also hosted 2018 Asian Games along with Palembang's complex and some other venues across Palembang, Banten, Greater Jakarta and West Java, while it served only with other venues across Greater Jakarta and West Java during the subsequent Para Games.

The 2023 FIBA Basketball World Cup was held at a new 17,150 seater arena within the sports complex known as Indonesia Arena; Indonesia was the co-host along with Japan and the Philippines. In 2025, Indonesia Arena hosted the 53rd Artistic Gymnastics World Championships.

== Facilities ==
The main stadium

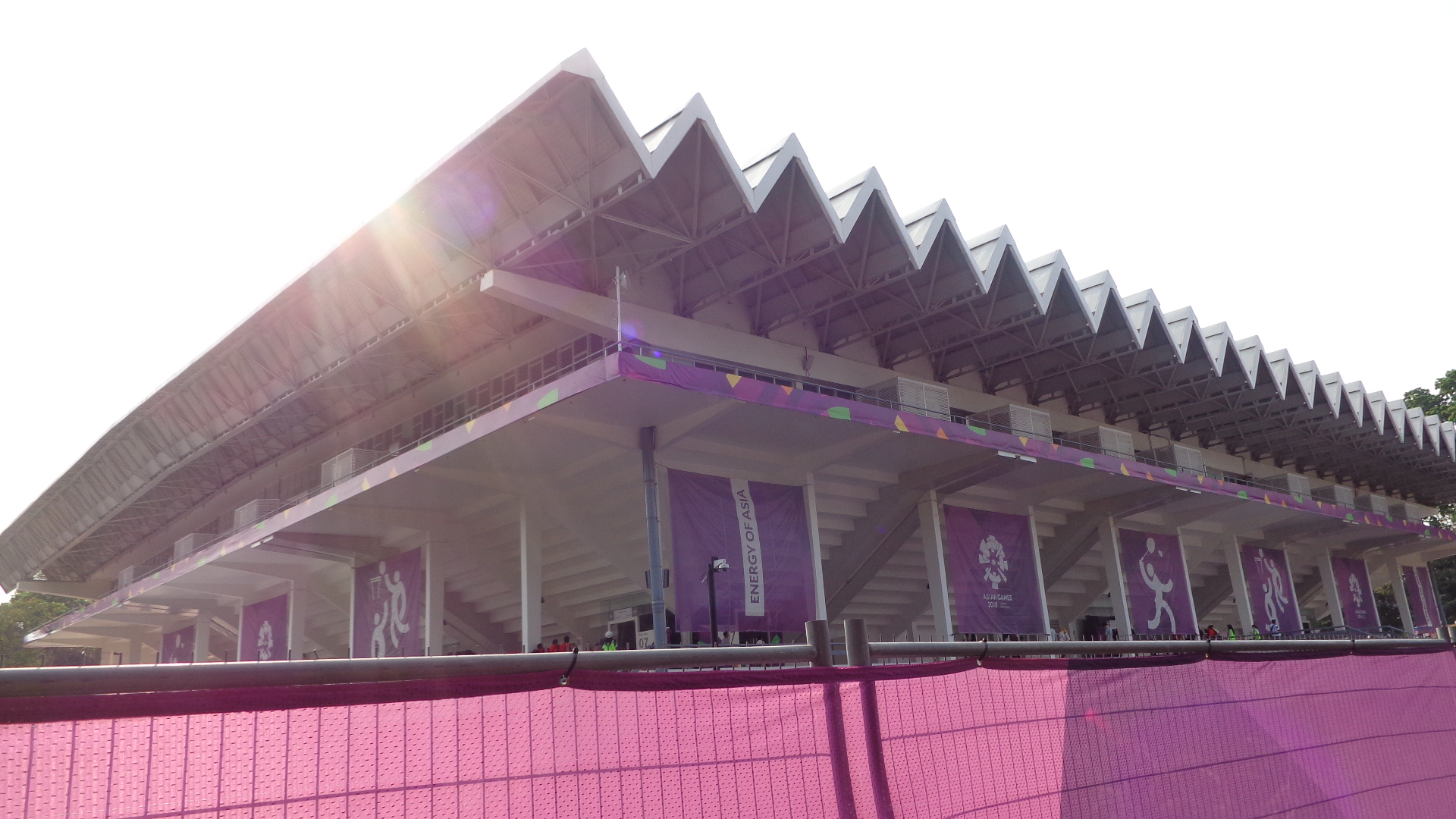
Exterior of the Istora during the 2018 Asian Games

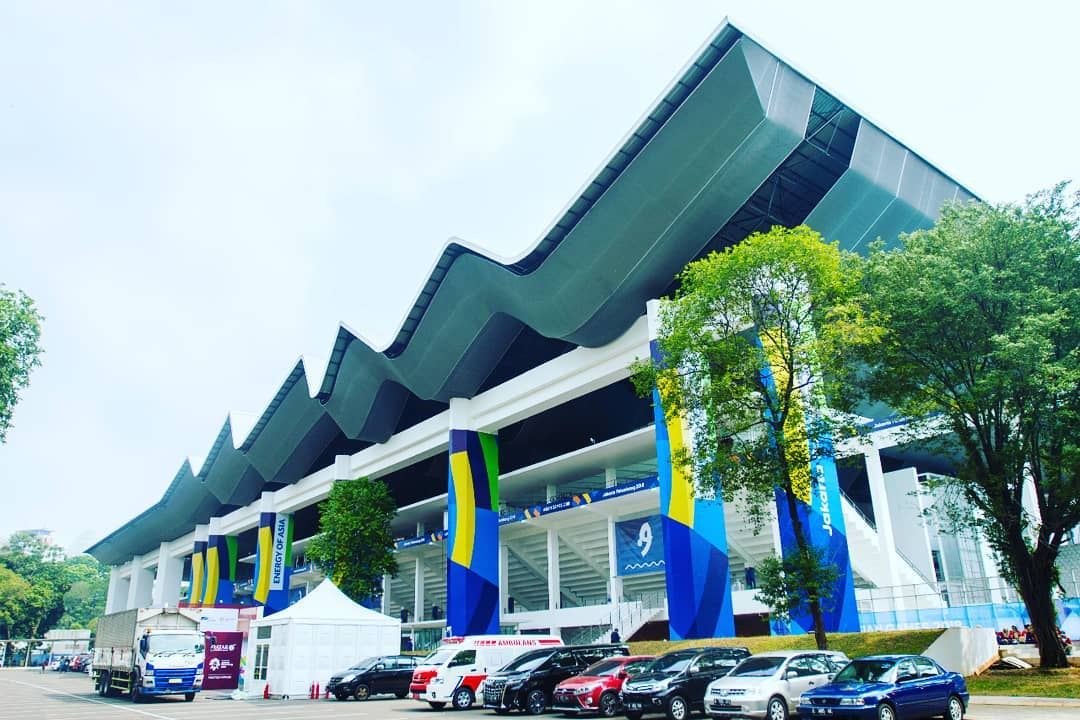
Gelora Bung Karno Aquatic Stadium. The 2016–17 renovation introduced a new, wave-shaped roof above the arena which originally only had roofs at the tribune.

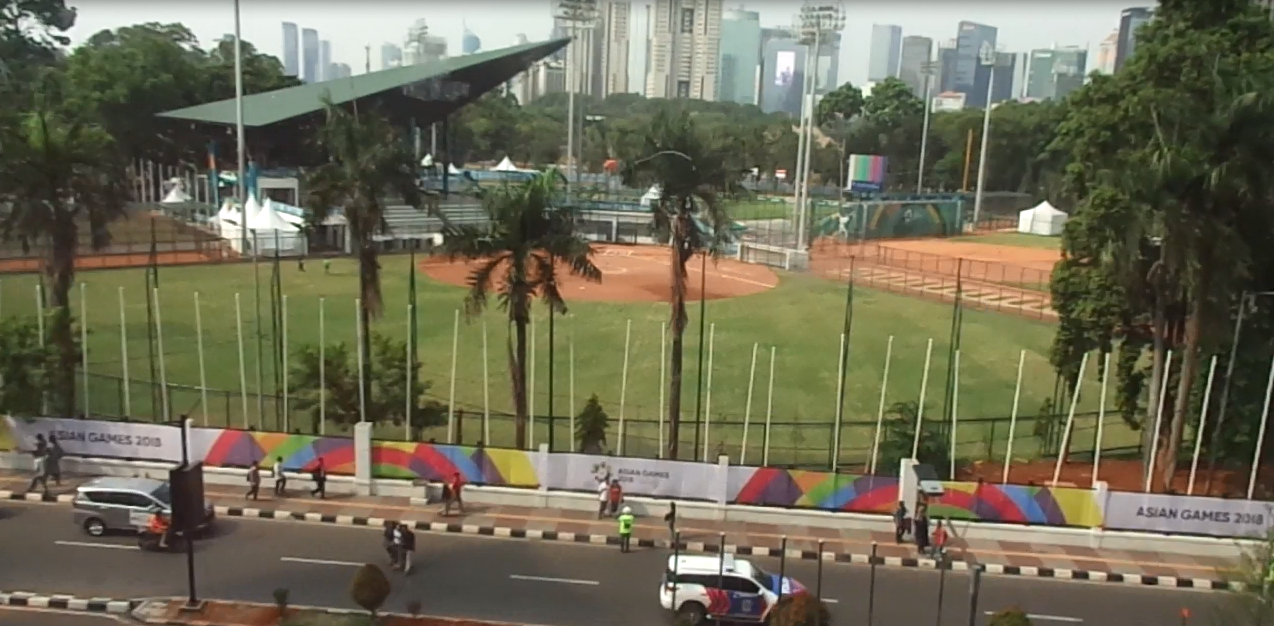
Photo of the Gelora Bung Karno Softball Field taken from the nearby shopping mall fX Sudirman

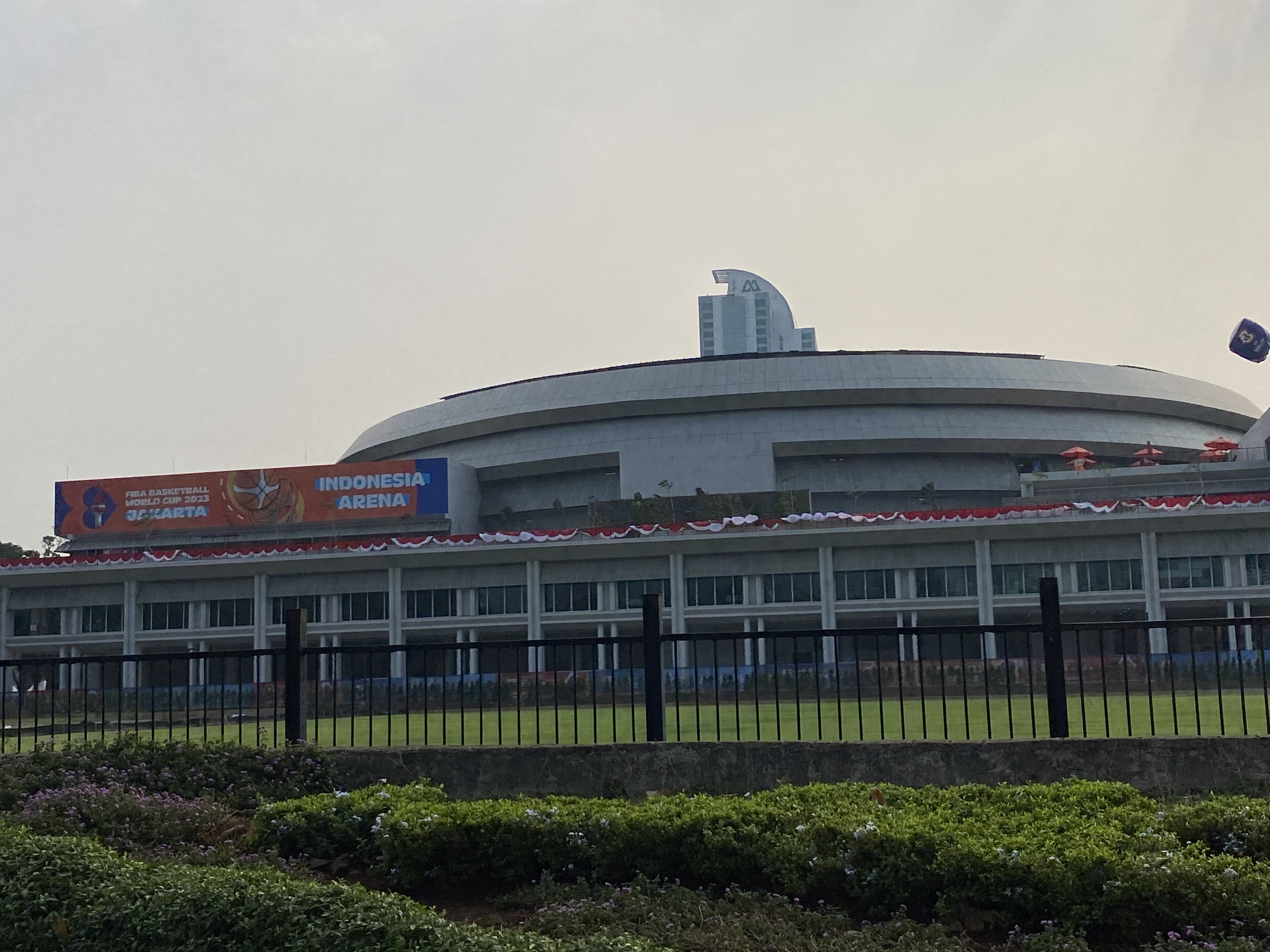
Exterior of the Indonesia Arena

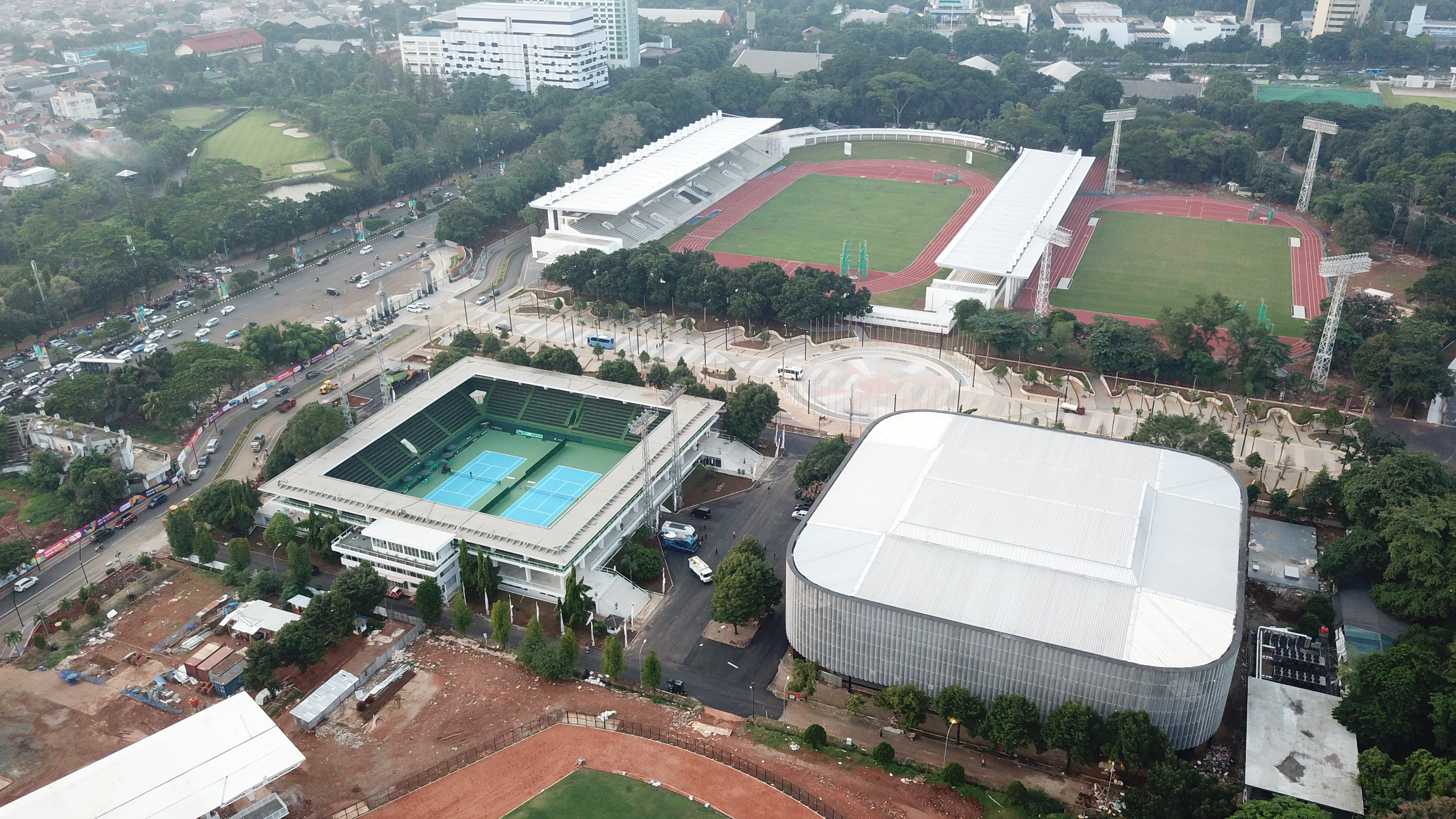
Madya, Tennis Indoor, and Tennis Outdoor arenas

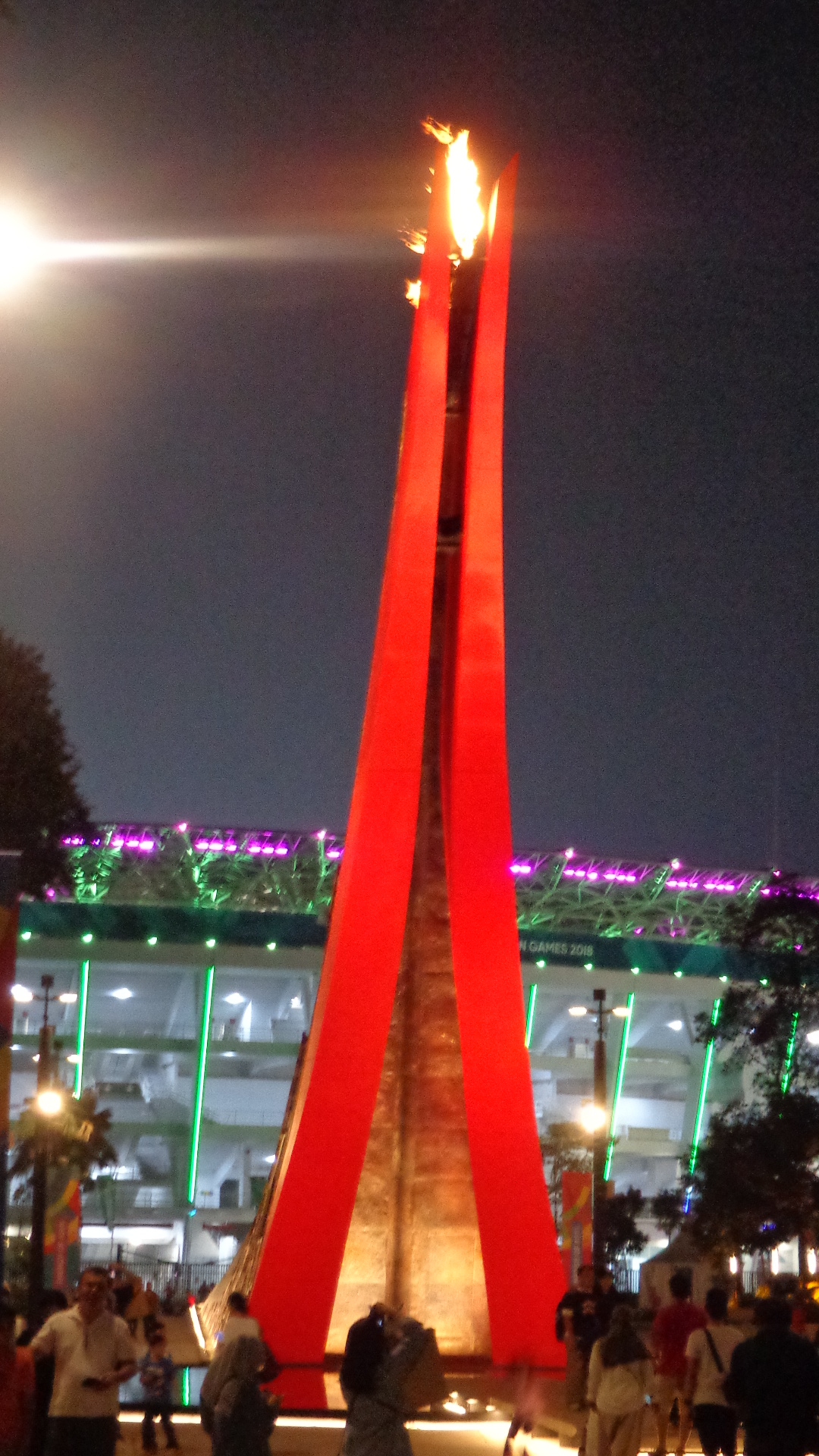
The 2018 Asian Games cauldron in the southeast of the complex

=== Sports venues ===
Venue	Purpose	Capacity	Built	Notes	Tenants
Gelora Bung Karno Main Stadium	Multi-use, mostly football	77,193	1960	Largest stadium in Indonesia (1962–2022)	Indonesia national football team
Istora Gelora Bung Karno	Multi-use, mostly badminton	7,166	1960		Indonesia Open (badminton) and Indonesia Masters
Gelora Bung Karno Aquatic Stadium	Aquatic sports	7,800	1960	Formerly named "Swimming Stadium"	
Gelora Bung Karno Tennis Indoor Stadium	Multi-use, mostly volleyball and concerts	3,750	1993	First sports arena in Southeast Asia to use retractable roof, it is no longer operable.	
Gelora Bung Karno Tennis Outdoor Stadium (Center Court)	Tennis	3,800	1960		
Gelora Bung Karno Madya Stadium	Athletics and football	9,170	1960		
Gelora Bung Karno Basketball Hall	Basketball	2,400	1960		
Gelora Bung Karno Baseball Field	Baseball	1,320	2016	Built on site of 12 tennis clay courts and 6 tennis hard courts	
Gelora Bung Karno Hockey Field	Field hockey	818	1973		
Gelora Bung Karno Softball Field	Softball	≈500	1996	Also called Lapangan Softball Pintu Satu (Gate One Softball Field) to distinguish it with the nearby, now-demolished Cemaratiga Softball Field. Can be upgraded with temporary seats to 2,000 capacity.	
Gelora Bung Karno Archery Field	Archery	97	1973		
Gelora Bung Karno Rugby Field	Rugby	N/A	2017	Built on the site of Lapangan D (D Football Field)	
Shooting range	Shooting	N/A	1992	New location. Mulia Hotel now stands in the original site.	
GBK Arena	Multi-sports training halls	N/A	2016	Located outside the main complex on the west, built on the site of Asia Afrika Sports Hall, a badminton training hall (originally completed in 1986)	
Volleyball Training Hall	Volleyball training	N/A	1988		
A, B, and C Football Field	Football training	N/A	1970		
Gateball Court	Gateball	N/A	2017		
Beach Volleyball Court	Beach volleyball	N/A	1996		
Gelora Bung Karno Squash Stadium	Squash	560	1996	Also called D Hall (Indonesian: Hall D)	
Gelora Bung Karno Tennis Court	Tennis	N/A	1993	Two hard courts	
Indonesia Arena	Multi-use	16,500	2023	During construction known as the "Indoor Multifunction Stadium"; held the 2023 FIBA Basketball World Cup	Indonesia men's national basketball team

=== Other buildings ===
==== Other buildings inside the complex ====
- Jakarta International Convention Center (completed 1974)
- Al Bina mosque (completed 2001)
- Jakarta Sultan Hotel (formerly Hilton Hotel Jakarta, completed 1971)
- Mulia Hotel (completed 1994)
- Krida Loka Park (completed 1987)
- GBK City Park (completed in 2019, stands on what was the Senayan Golf Course & Driving Range)

Initially, the sports complex covers a much larger area than it is today. During the 1980s to 1990s, several land plots were developed into non-sport facilities. The northern area was developed into government offices while the southern area was developed into hotels and shopping malls. The complex also had a radio-controlled car circuit northwest of the main stadium, which was scrapped during the 2017 renovation.

==== Northern area ====
- DPR/MPR (Parliament) Building (completed 1968)
- TVRI Studios and National Headquarters Building (completed 1962)
- Ministry of Youth and Sports Building (completed 1983)
- National Forestry Museum (Manggala Wanabakti, formerly Ministry of Forestry office, completed 1983)
- Senayan Park (completed 2020, stands on the former site of Taman Ria Senayan)

==== Southern area ====
The southern area was originally an athlete village for the 1962 Asian Games. The village was demolished in the 1970s. Several buildings now stood in their location.

- Century Park Hotel (completed 1990)
- Ratu Plaza (completed 1982)
- Plaza Senayan (completed 1996)
- Senayan Trade Center (completed 2006)
- Senayan City (completed 2006)
- fX Sudirman (completed 2008)
- Fairmont Jakarta Hotel (completed 2015)
- Multipurpose Building (completed 1987)

=== Demolished buildings or facilities ===
- Remote controlled-car racing circuit
- Asia Afrika Sports Hall
- Volleyball Arena that was used during the 1962 Asian Games
- 18 tennis courts located south of the tennis stadiums.
- Roller sports court
- Gymnastics Building
- Cemaratiga Softball Field
- Senayan Golf Range
- Street Dirt Senayan

== Entertainment events ==
=== Tennis Indoor/Outdoor ===
==== 2000 - 2019 ====
Date	Artists	Events
9 March 2009	Lamb of God	Wrath Tour
29 April 2010	Kelly Clarkson	All I Ever Wanted Tour
28 September 2012	Keane	Strangeland Tour
3 November 2012	Wonder Girls	Wonder World Tour
27 May 2013	Carly Rae Jepsen	The Summer Kiss Tour
19 October 2013	CNBLUE	Blue Moon World Tour
14 February 2015	Taeyang	Rise World Tour
18 November 2018	iKon	iKon 2018 Continue Tour
24 March 2019	Boyzone	Thank You & Goodnight Tour
13 August 2019	LANY	Malibu Nights World Tour
14 August 2019	LANY	Malibu Nights World Tour
30 November 2019	Day6	Gravity World Tour
1 December 2019	Day6	Gravity World Tour
28 December 2019	IU	Love, Poem
29 December 2019	IU	Love, Poem

==== 2020 - present ====
Date	Artists	Events
19 January 2020	Bon Iver	I, I Tour
14 July 2022	Louis Tomlinson	Louis Tomlinson World Tour
4 February 2023	Itzy	Checkmate World Tour
23 April 2024	Incubus	Asia Tour 2024
30 April 2024	All Time Low	Forever
26 May 2024	Eve	Eve Asia Tour 2024 "Culture"
8 June 2024	BabyMonster	BABYMONSTER PRESENTS: SEE YOU THERE
10 August 2024	Suho	WELCOME TO SU:HOME
13 November 2024	Take That	THIS LIFE ON TOUR
18 January 2025	Infinite	Infinite 15th Anniversary Concert: Limited Edition
31 May 2025	NCT Wish	NCT WISH LOGIN SEOUL-ASIA
14 June 2025	Kai	KAI SOLO CONCERT TOUR <KAION>
12 November 2025	Hatsune Miku	Miku Expo 2025 Asia

=== Basketball Hall ===
Date	Artists	Events
28 November 2022	Keshi	Hell/Heaven Tour
29 November 2022	Keshi	Hell/Heaven Tour
23 November 2023	D4vd	Petals to Thorns Tour
6 July 2024	Lisa	LiVE is Smile Always Asia Tour 2024
28 June 2025	STAYC	2025 STAYC TOUR STAYTUNED

== Gallery ==
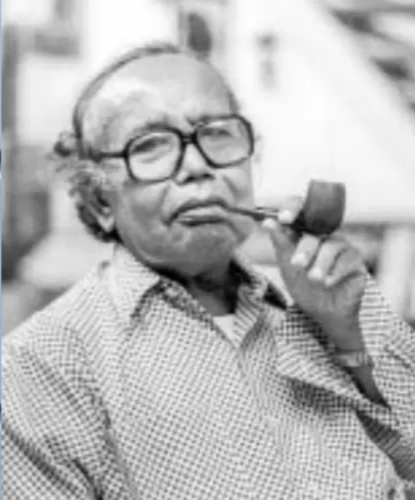
Friedrich Silaban, architect of the stadium and entire Gelora Bung Karno Sports Complex.

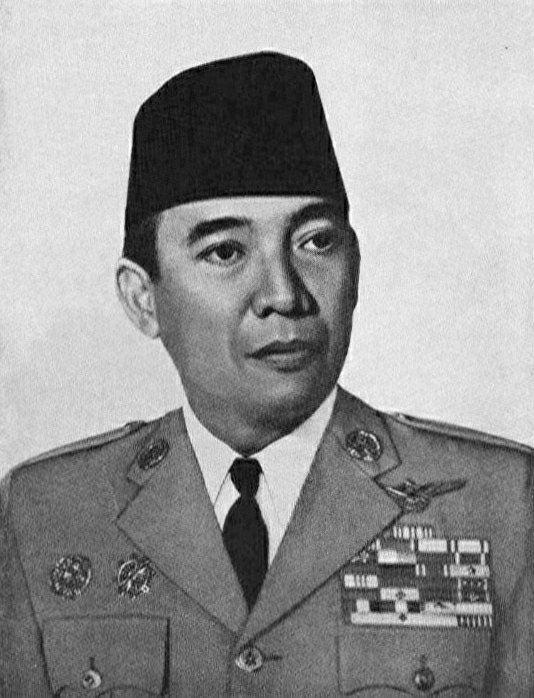
President Sukarno, the namesake of the stadium.

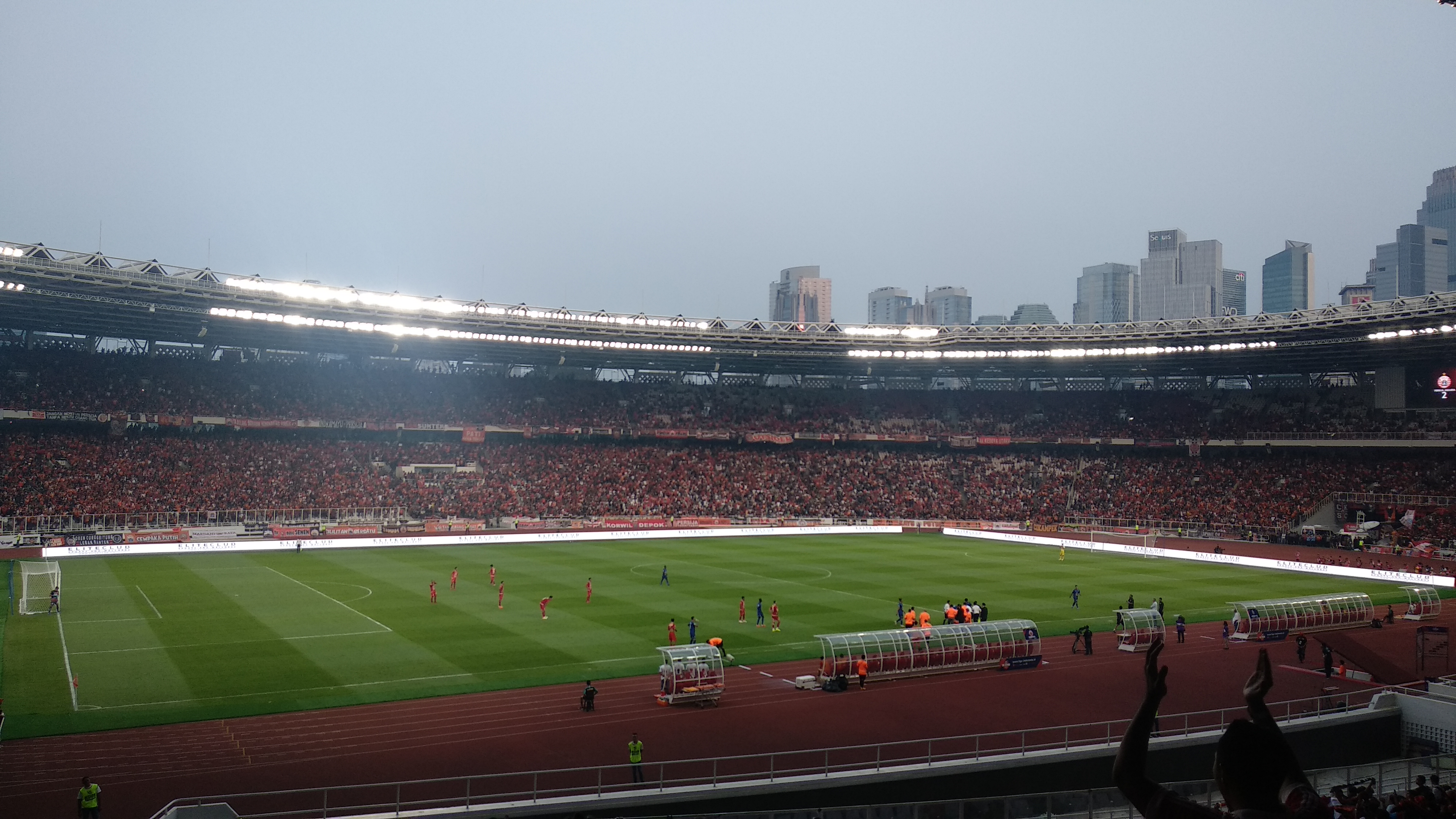
The main stadium during a Liga 1 match.

== Bibliography ==
- Pour, Julius (2004), Dari Gelora Bung Karno ke Gelora Bung Karno (in Indonesian), Jakarta: Grasindo, ISBN 978-979-732-444-5.
