= Senayan City =

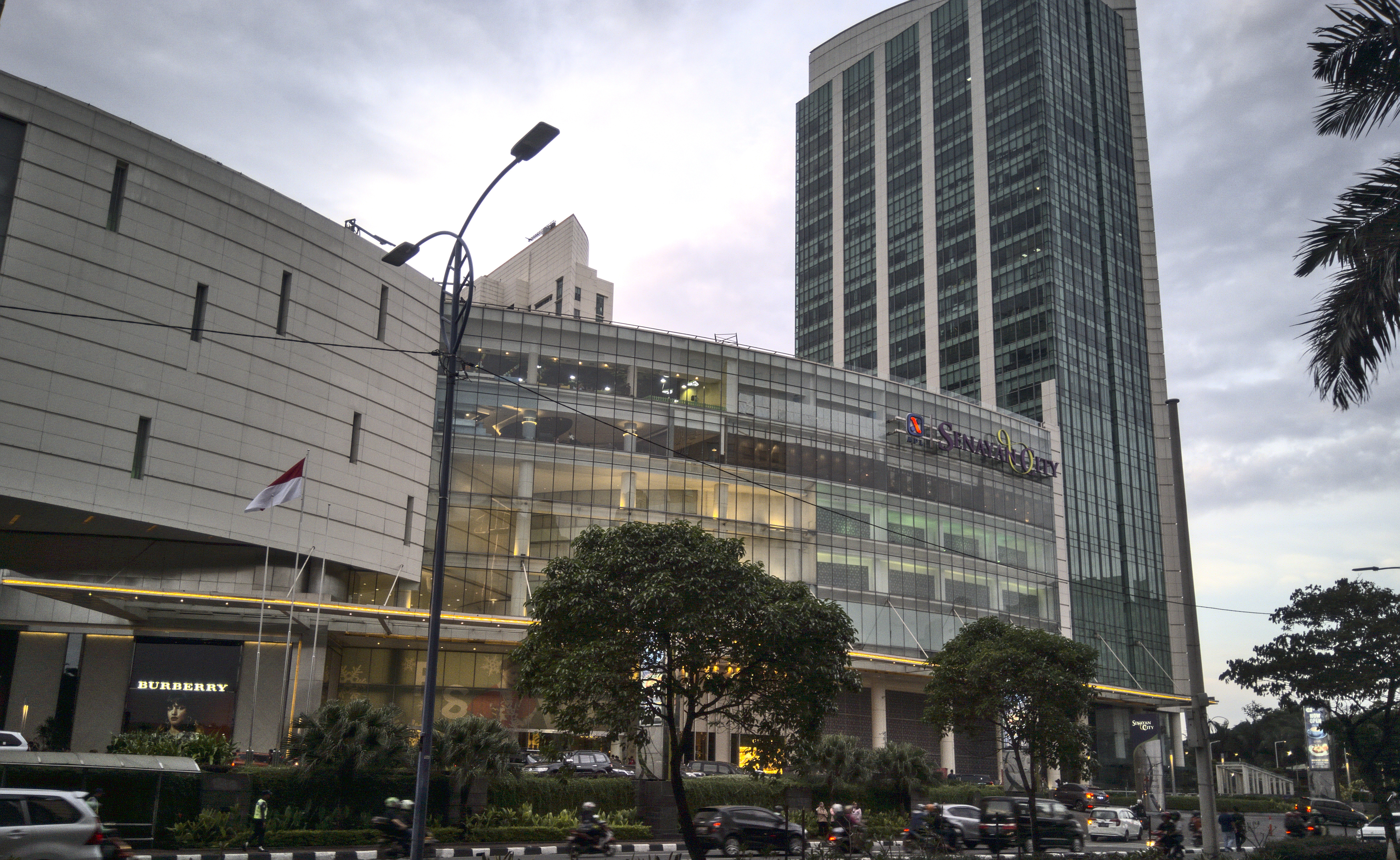
- Exterior of the shopping mall and Panin Bank Tower office building (right)
- Location: Senayan, Kebayoran Baru, Central Jakarta, Indonesia
- Coordinates: 6°13′38.60″S 106°47′49.60″E
- Opened: September 21, 2006
- Developer: Agung Podomoro Land
- Manager: Agung Podomoro Land
- Owner: Agung Podomoro Land
- Architect: DP Architects
- Num. of stores: 244
- Floor area: 76,000 m^{2} (820,000 sq ft)
- Floors: 8 (retail), 21 (office), 17 (hotel), 25 (residential apartment)
- Parking: 3,500 lots
- Public transit: Senayan Mastercard; Bundaran Senayan
- Website: www.senayancity.com

Senayan City (also often known as Sen C or Sency) is a mixed-use development located in Senayan area, Central Jakarta, Indonesia. The complex comprises a seven-floor high end shopping mall, two boutique office towers (one occupied by SCTV as their headquarters, one anchored by Panin Bank) and an apartment tower. Senayan City is built on a land area of 48,000 m^{2} (520,000 sq ft) owned by the nearby Gelora Bung Karno Sports Complex Authority (PPKGBK). It is built and managed by Manggala Gelora Perkasa, a subsidiary of Agung Podomoro Group, under the BOT contract for 50 years which starts in 2005. They used Pulau Intan as their main contractor, Structure and mechanical engineering contractor. The development was designed by DP Architects.

== History ==
The shopping mall, soft opened on 23 June 2006 and grand opened on 21 September 2006. During construction, premium hotel chain Sofitel had planned to open in Senayan City with an estimated opening for 2007, which was ultimately scrapped and its designated building was converted into another office tower leased by Panin Bank.

== Incident ==
On 20 April 2023, a fire occurred at the mall, causing damage to several restaurants but no reported casualties. The mall reopened the next day after repairs were made.

== Gallery ==
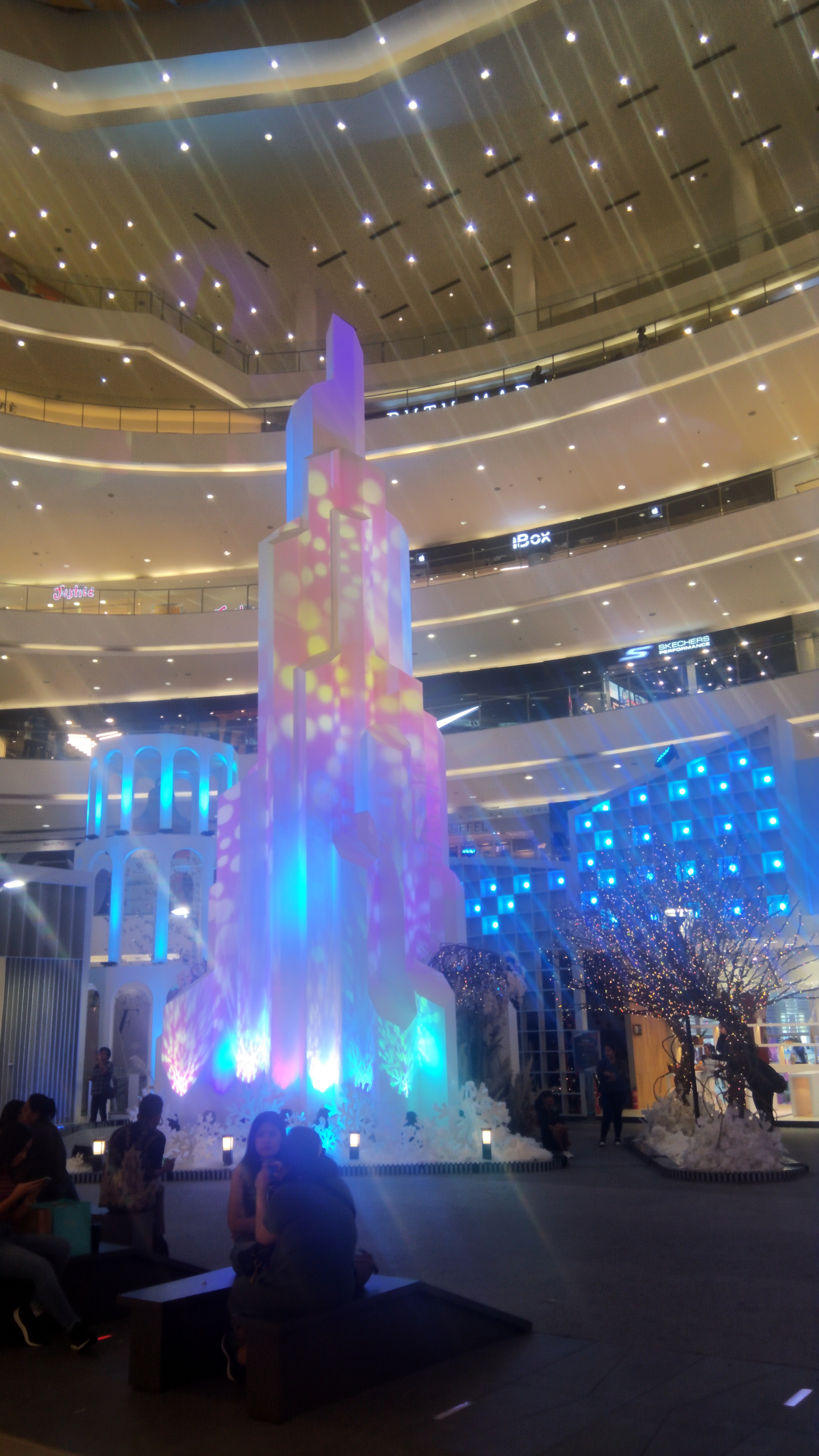
Senayan City's Christmas decor, 2018

== See also ==
- List of shopping malls in Indonesia
- Plaza Senayan
- FX Sudirman
