= Kompas Multimedia Towers =

- Interactive map of the Kompas Multimedia Towers area

General information
- Type: office
- Location: Jakarta, Indonesia, Jl. Palmerah Selatan 21, Gelora, Tanah Abang
- Coordinates: 6.2098026°S 106.7958950°E
- Construction started: 2014
- Completed: 2018

Height
- Architectural: 226 m (741 ft),138 m (453 ft) and 92 m (302 ft)

Technical details
- Floor count: 52, 27 and 18

Design and construction
- Architect: Denton Corker Marshall
- Developer: Kompas Gramedia
- Structural engineer: PT Davy Sukamta
- Main contractor: PT Total Bangun Persada Tbk.

Kompas Multimedia Towers is a complex of 3 towers, named Menara Kompas I, II and III, which is situated at Gelora, Tanah Abang, Central Jakarta, Indonesia. The complex has a land area of about 1.2 hectares. Tower I has a height of 92 meters and 18 floors, tower II has height of 138 meters and 27 floors, and tower III has height of 226 meters and 52 floors. Construction of Tower I and II was completed in 2017. Construction of tower III is expected to be completed by 2018.

== See also ==
Ground-level view of Kompas Multimedia Towers

- List of tallest buildings in Indonesia
- List of tallest buildings in Jakarta
