= Ratu Plaza =

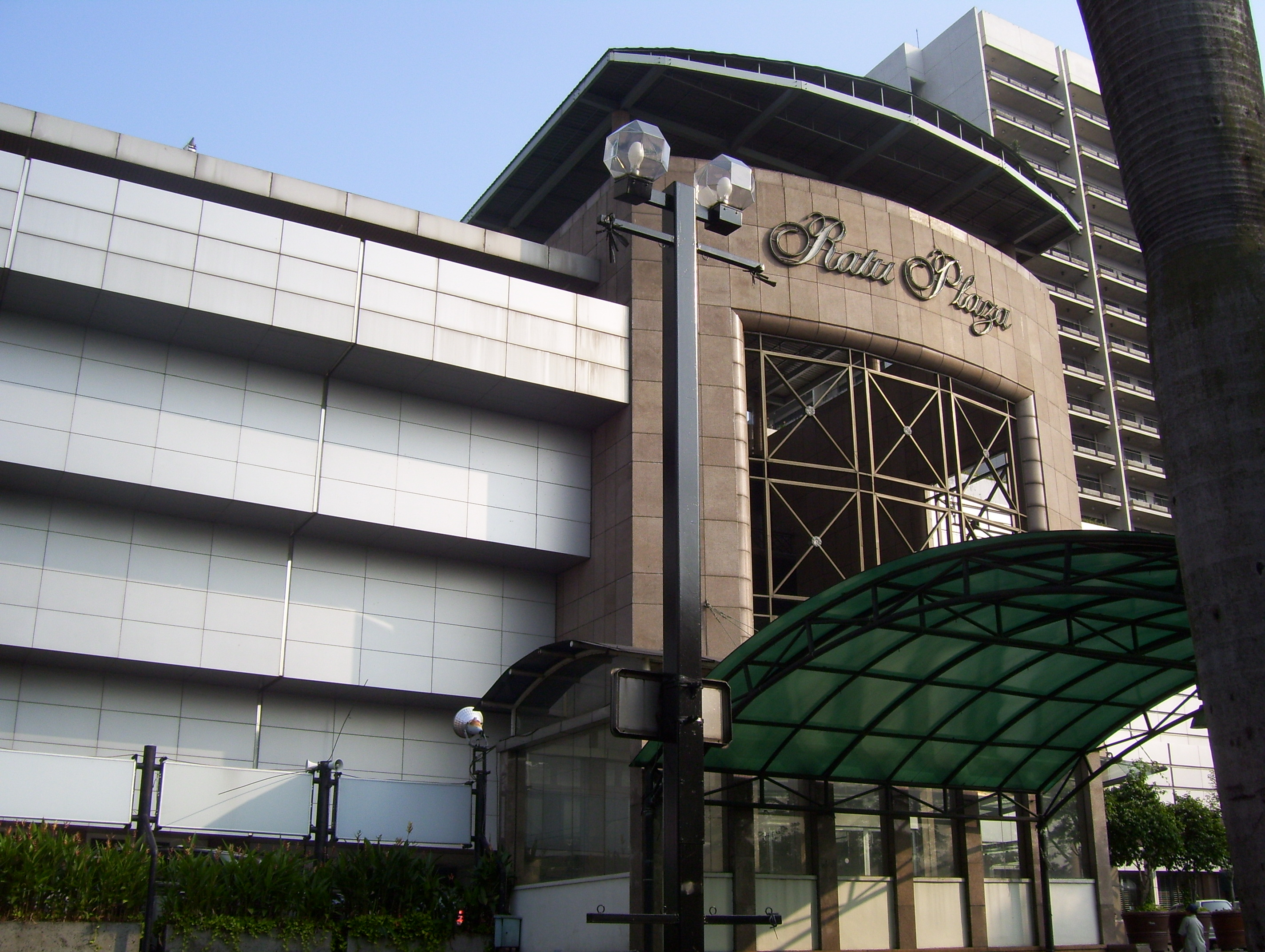
- Location: Gelora, Tanah Abang, Central Jakarta, Indonesia
- Coordinates: 6.2264834°S 106.8009711°E
- Address: Jl. Jenderal Sudirman Kav. 9
- Opened: 12 December 1980
- Owner: PT Ratu Sayang Internasional
- Floor area: 58,084 m^{2} (625,210 sq ft)
- Floors: 5
- Public transit: Senayan Mastercard; Bundaran Senayan

The Ratu Plaza (also known as e-Mall or e-Mall Ratu Plaza) is a shopping mall located in Gelora, Tanah Abang, Central Jakarta, Indonesia. It consists of five floors, four of which have over 6,000 m² of retail space.

The mall mainly caters to information technology customers in South Jakarta and gained reputation among expatriates and Indonesians alike for being a hotbed for bootlegged DVDs. In the 80s the mall was the host to the first Nike showroom for Indonesian market. Other big names such as Kicker's, and Levi's also had outlets in Ratu Plaza. The French luxury department store Printemps had plans to open its first Indonesian store here (in which the mall's management responded by overhauling the Mall's design into something that is more luxurious as in the neighboring Plaza Senayan) though, its opening was cancelled due to the 1997 Asian financial crisis.

The mall's Carrefour supermarket (since replaced with Lotte Mart) suffered several gas poisoning incidents in 2007 and 2008, to the point that Jakarta's governor at the time Fauzi Bowo mulled a shutdown of the supermarket.

== See also ==
- List of malls in Jakarta
- List of shopping malls in Indonesia
