= Avianti Armand =

Indonesian artist

Avianti Armand (born Jakarta, July 12, 1969) is an Indonesian artist. She is well-known for her poetic works, which have appeared in various mass media. Other than writing, she also works as an architect and a guest lecturer of architecture at the University of Indonesia, and of interior design at Pelita Harapan University. In 2011 she was a recipient of a Khatulistiwa Literary Award in the poetry category for her work Perempuan yang Dihapus Namanya.
