= Senayan Mastercard MRT station =

MRT station in Jakarta, Indonesia

M08 Senayan Mastercard
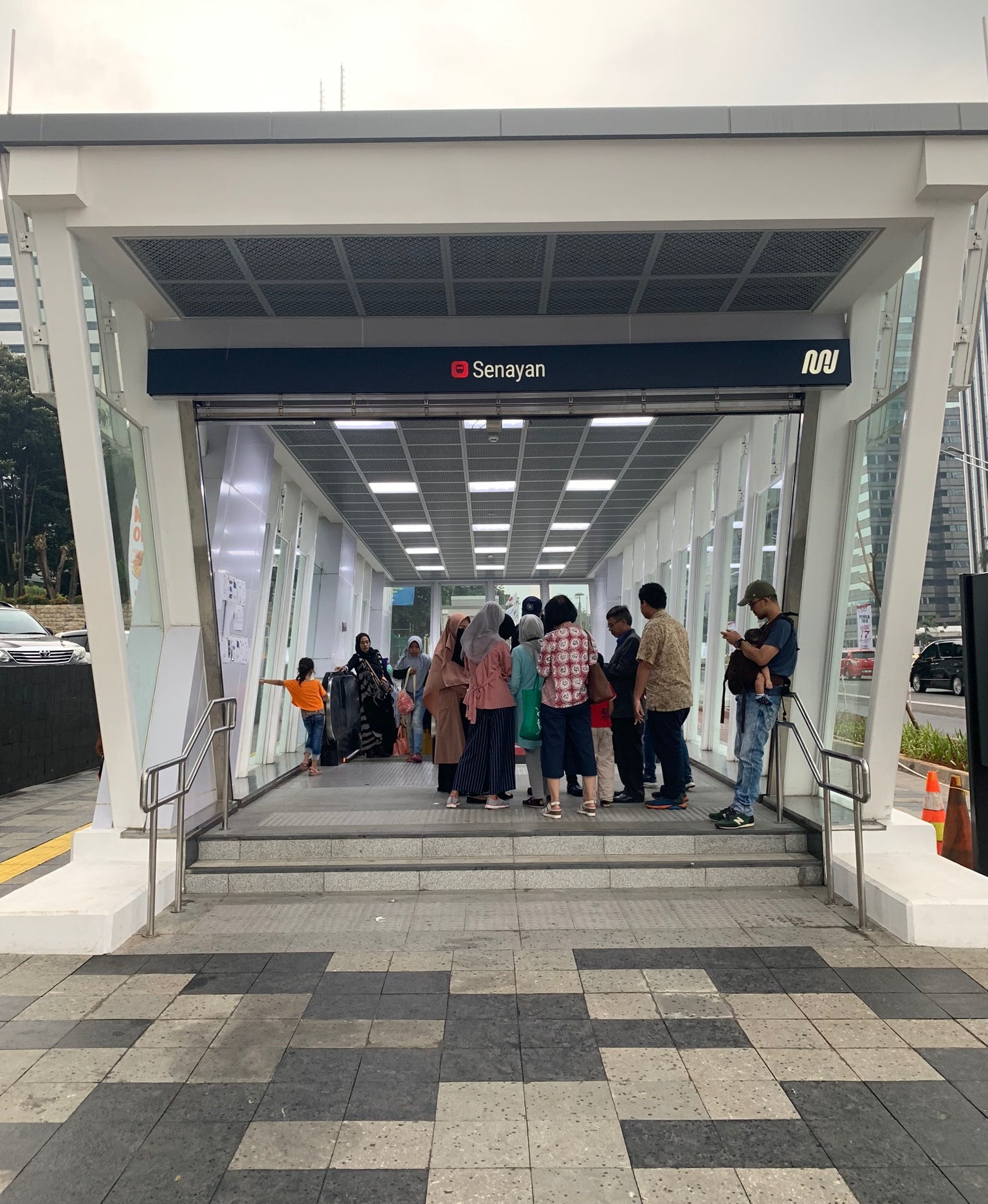
- An entrance to Senayan Station

General information
- Location: Jl. Jenderal Sudirman, Senayan, Kebayoran Baru, South Jakarta; Jakarta; Indonesia
- Coordinates: 6.226683°S 106.802456°E
- Owner: MRT Jakarta
- Operator: MRT Jakarta
- Line: North–South line
- Platforms: single island platform
- Tracks: 2
- Connections: Bundaran Senayan

Construction
- Structure type: Underground
- Depth: 14 m (46 ft)
- Parking: Available
- Accessible: Available

Other information
- Station code: SNY

History
- Opened: 24 March 2019; 7 years ago

Services
Preceding station	Jakarta MRT	Following station
ASEAN Headquarters towards Lebak Bulus	North-South Line	Istora Mandiri towards Bundaran HI Bank Jakarta
Route map
Location
- Location within Jakarta

Senayan Station (or Senayan Mastercard MRT Station, with Mastercard granted for naming rights) is a rapid transit station on the North-South Line of the Jakarta MRT in Jakarta, Indonesia. Located on Jl. Jendral Sudirman, it is the first underground station (when heading north towards Bundaran HI Bank Jakarta) on the MRT. It is located between the Istora Mandiri and ASEAN Headquarters stations, and has the station code of SNY. The station is located close to the Ratu Plaza Shopping Center, within walking distance of the malls of Senayan City and Plaza Senayan.

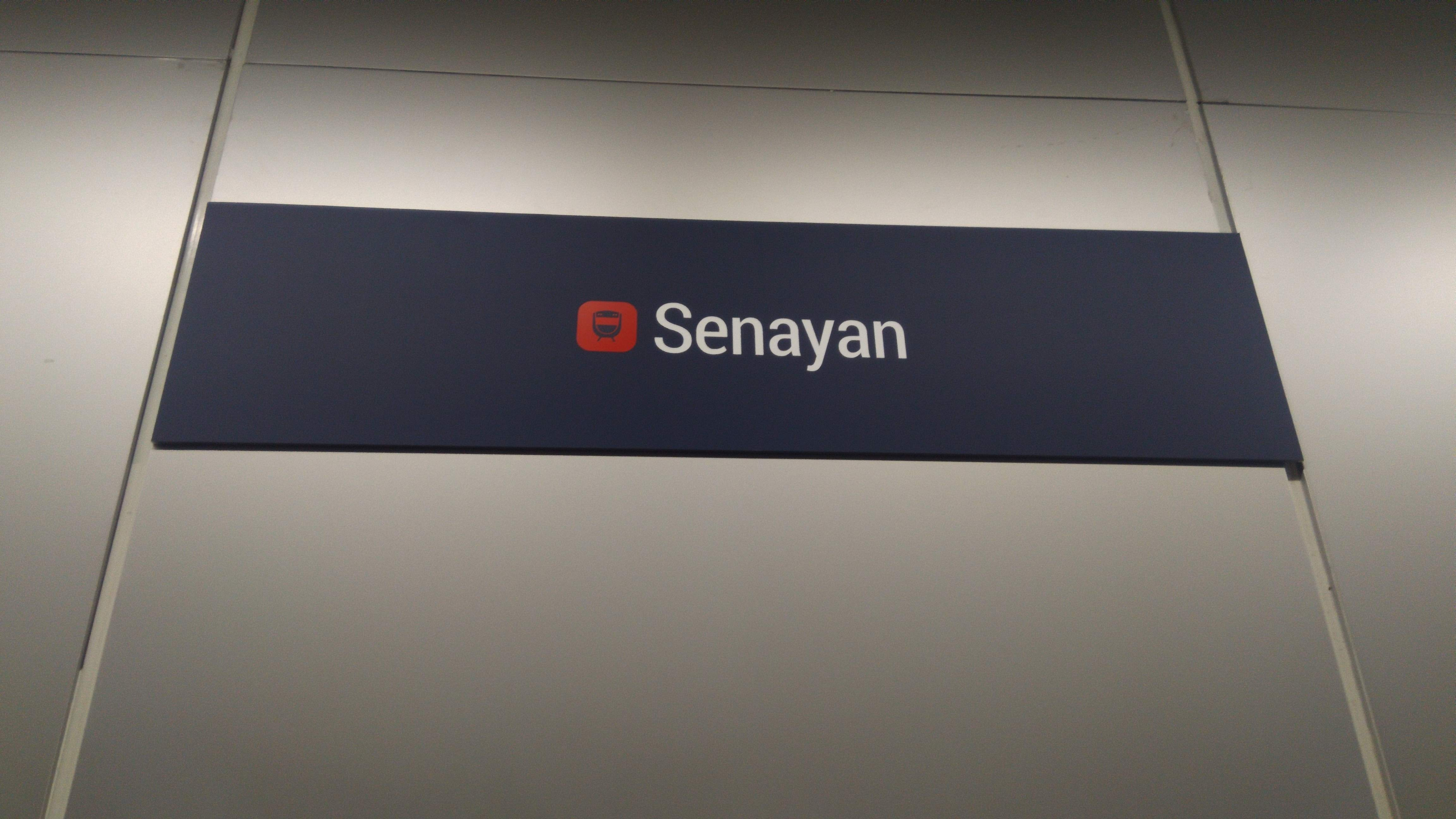
The station sign

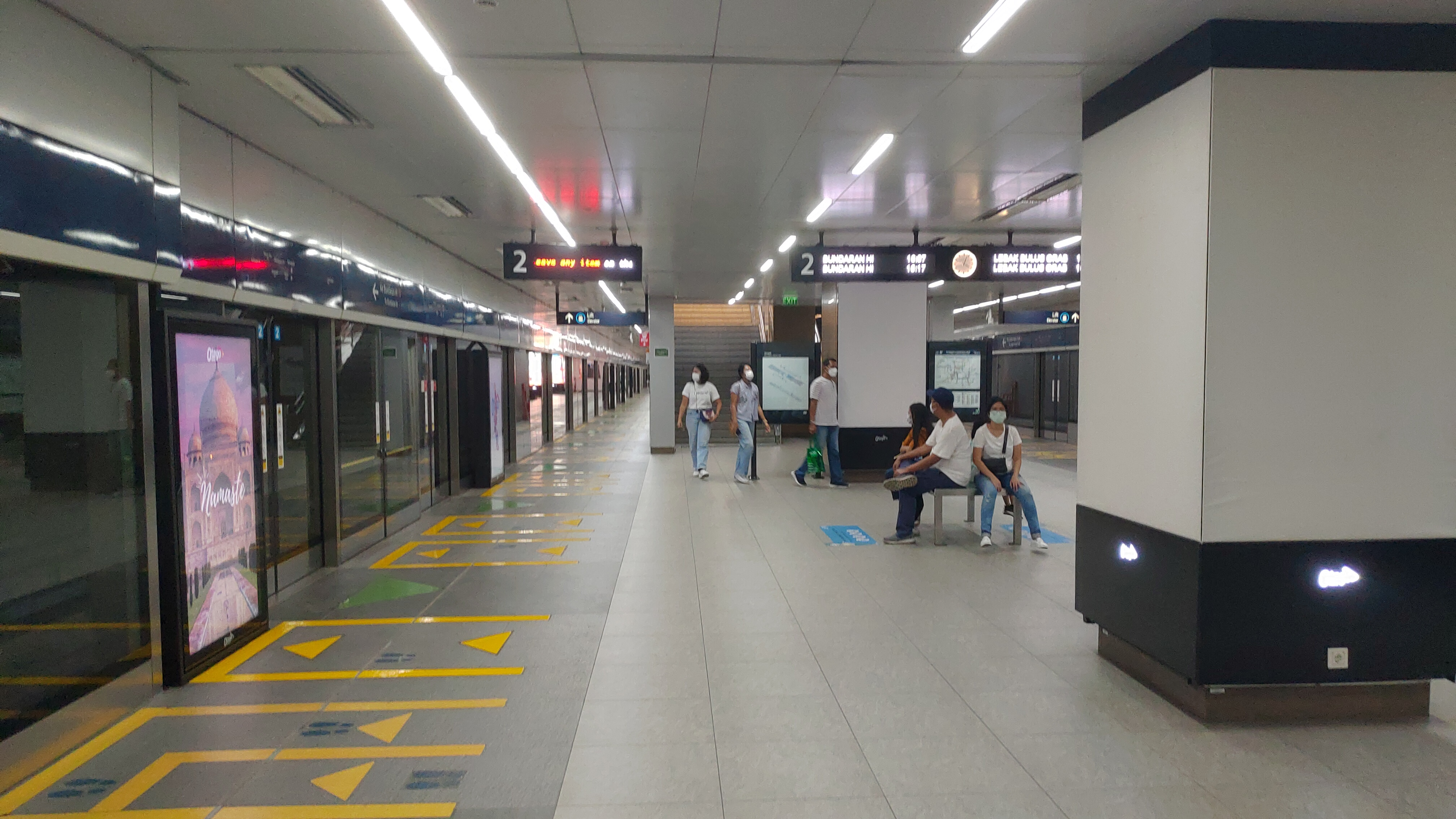
Platform of the Senayan Station

== Location ==
The southernmost underground station on the MRT, Senayan station is located on Jl. Jendral Sudirman in Kebayoran Baru, South Jakarta. Nearby are the shopping malls of Ratu Plaza, Senayan City, and Plaza Senayan. The station is located close to the Senayan Roundabout and Youth Advancement Monument Statue, as well as Jl. Pattimura and Jl. Senopati.

== History ==
The station officially opened, along with the rest of Phase 1 of the Jakarta MRT on 24 March 2019.

== Station layout ==
G	Street	Entrances and exits
B1	Concourse	Ticket gates, ticket machines, counters, and retail kiosks
B2; Platform	Platform 1	North South Line to Lebak Bulus (←)
B2; Platform	Island, the doors are opened on the left side
B2; Platform	Platform 2	North South Line to Bundaran HI Bank Jakarta (→)

== Gallery ==
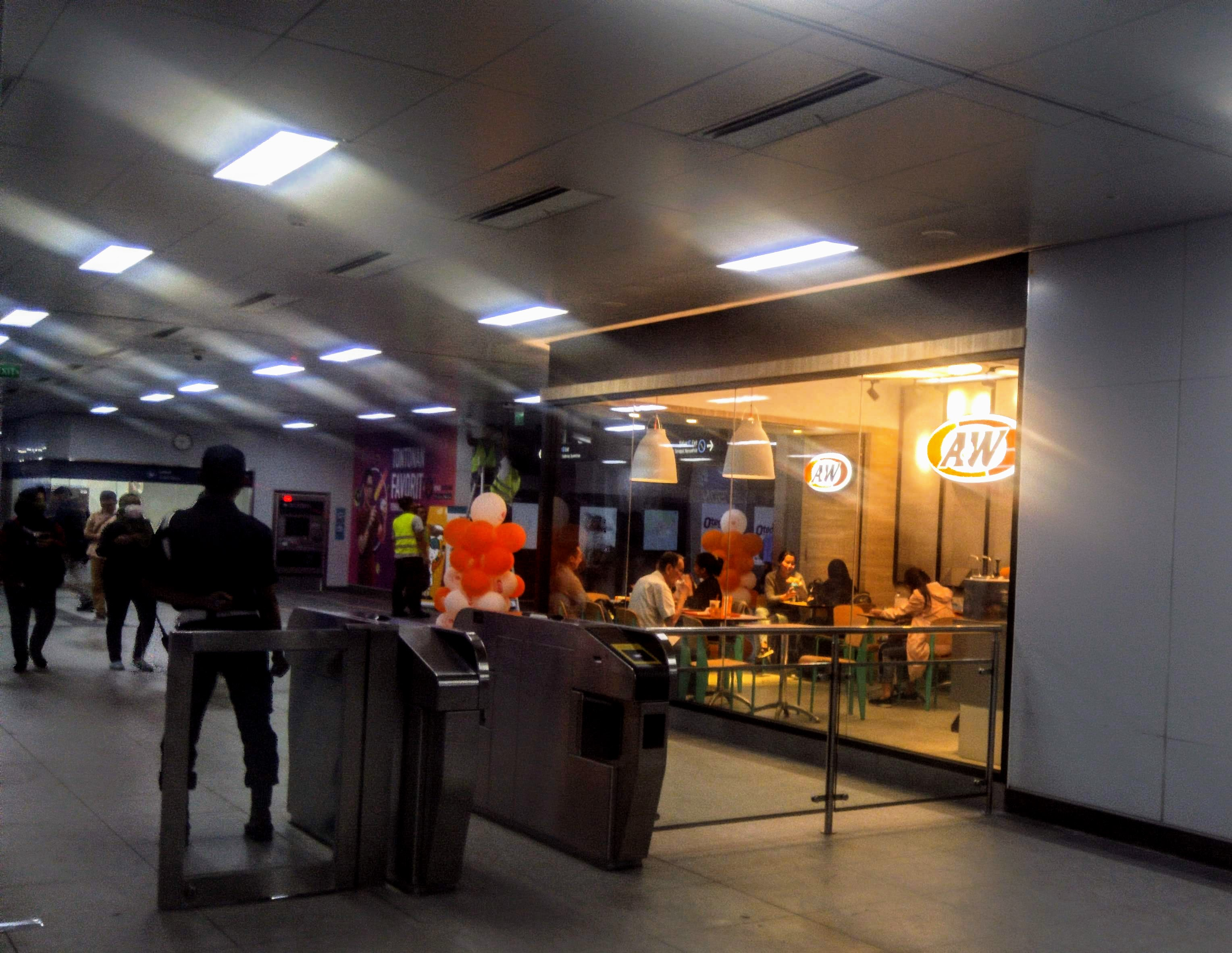
An A&W Restaurant at the station concourse

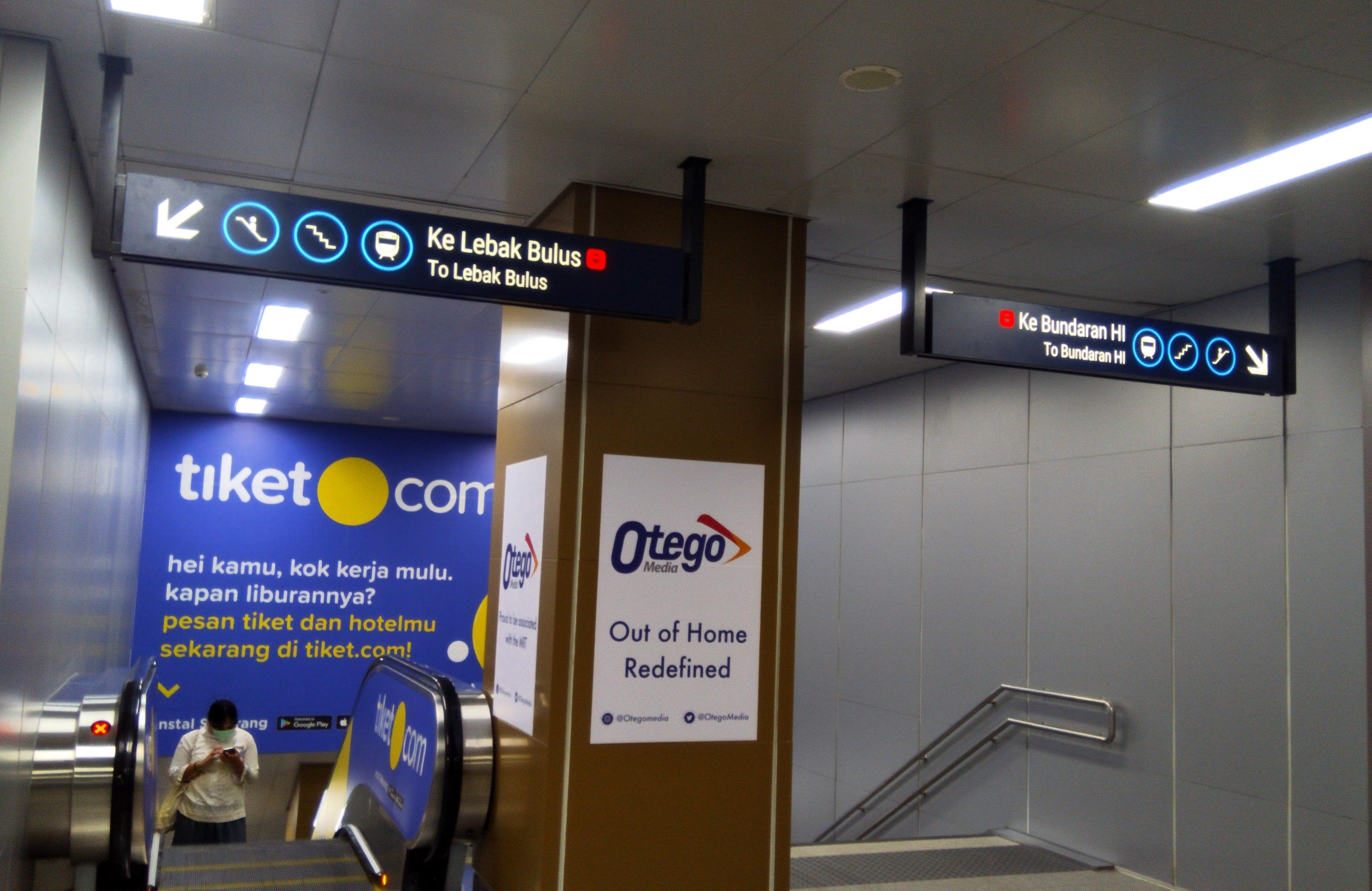
The stairs to the station platform

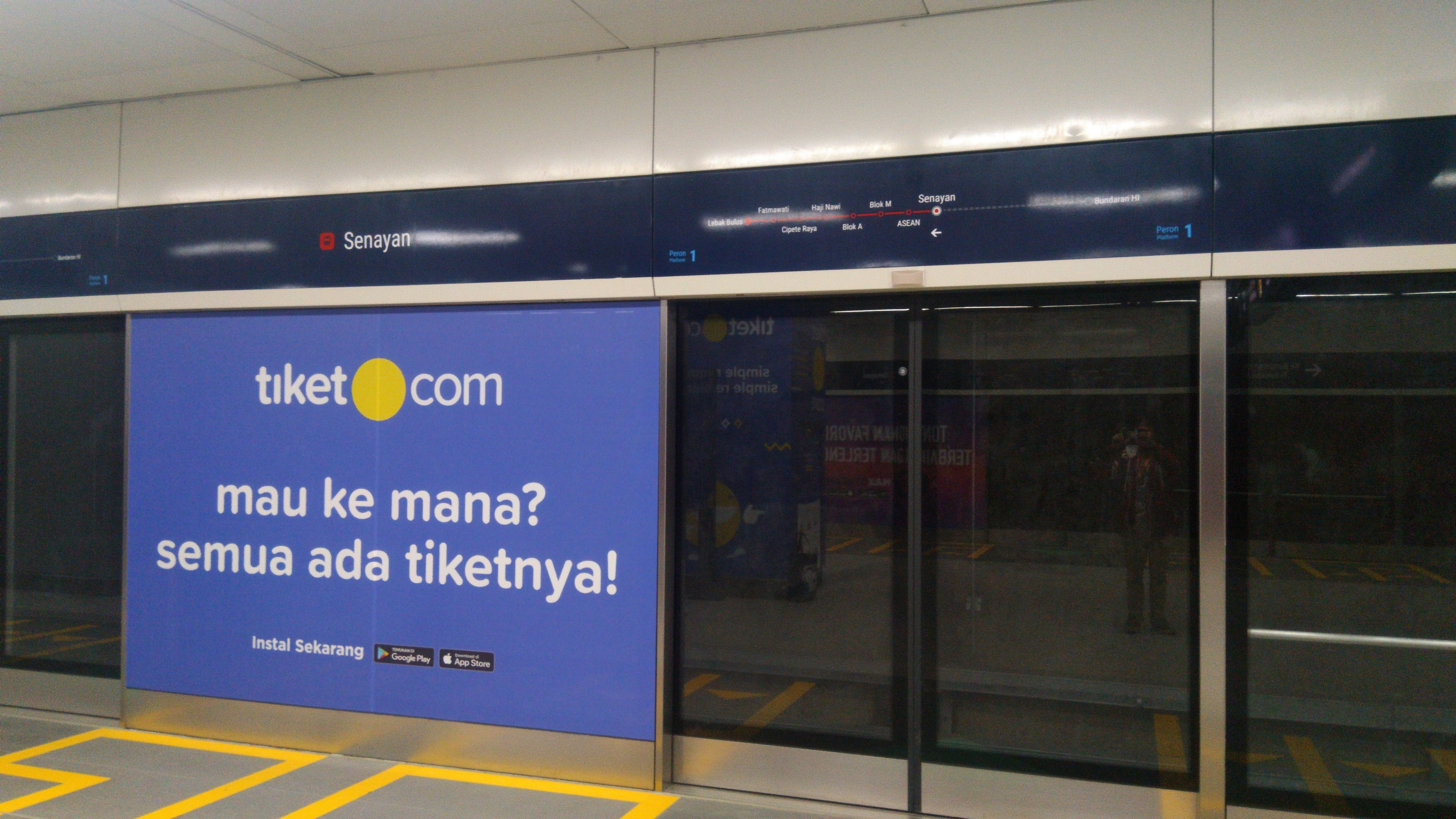
The platform screen doors of the station
