= Gelora, Tanah Abang =

Gelora
- Urban village
- Interactive map of Gelora
- Country: Indonesia
- Province: DKI Jakarta
- Administrative city: Central Jakarta
- District: Tanah Abang
- Postal code: 10270

Gelora is the southernmost administrative village in the Tanah Abang district of Central Jakarta, Jakarta, Indonesia. It has postal code of 10270. The country's first centralized sports complex, the Gelora Bung Karno, and the headquarters of the first television network in Indonesia, TVRI, are located in this district.

== Sights ==
- Gelora Bung Karno
- Kompas Multimedia Towers

== See also ==
- Tanah Abang
- List of administrative villages of Jakarta
