= Plaza Senayan =

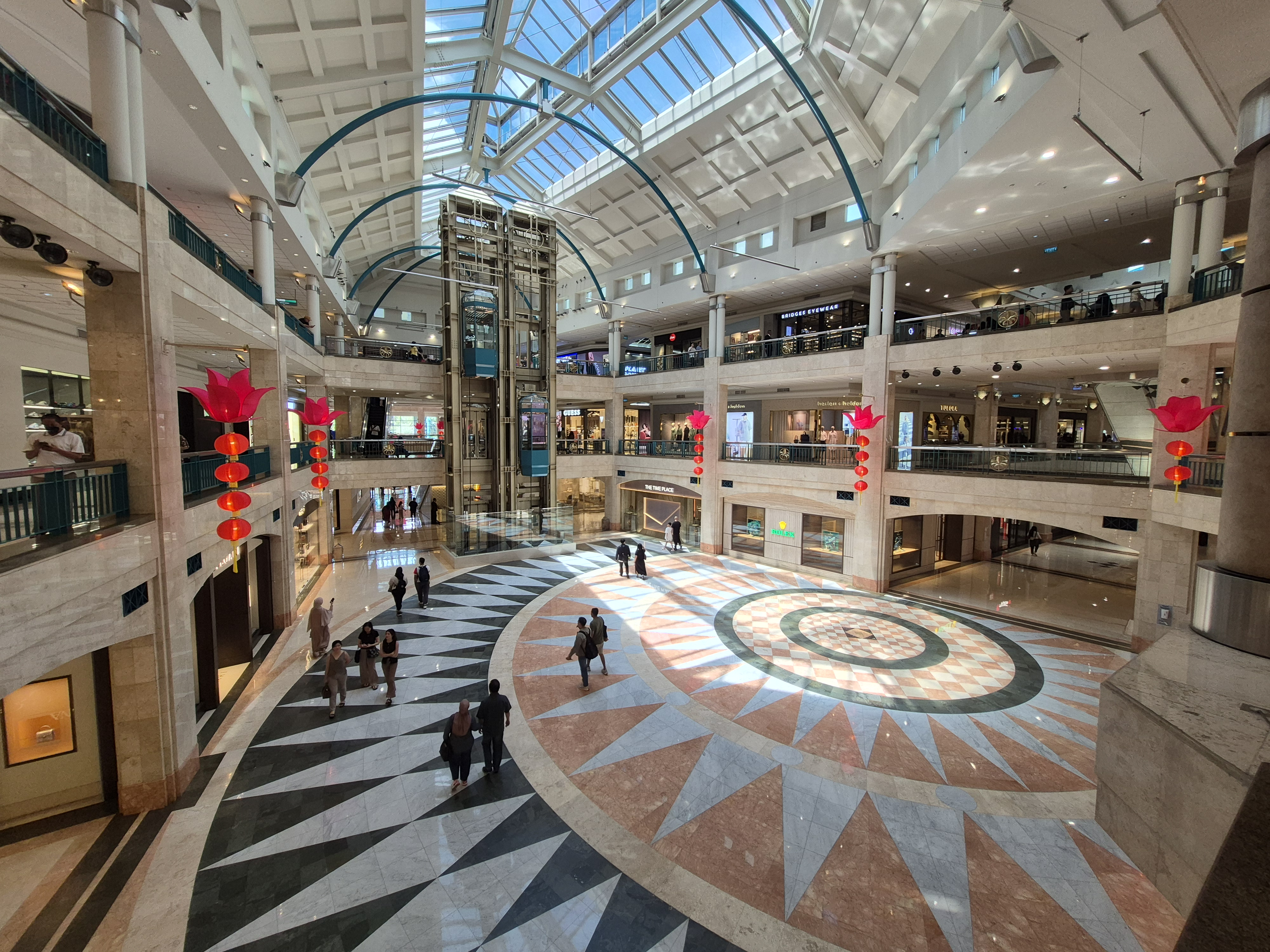
- Interior view of Plaza Senayan
- Location: Gelora, Tanah Abang, Central Jakarta, Indonesia
- Coordinates: 6°13′33.62″S 106°47′56.84″E
- Address: Jl. Asia Afrika
- Opened: 26 April 1996
- Developer: Kajima Corporation
- Manager: PT Senayan Trikarya Sempana
- Owner: PT Senayan Trikarya Sempana
- Num. of stores: 250+
- Num. of anchor tenants: 3
- Floor area: 130,500 m^{2} (1,405,000 sq ft)
- Floors: 3 plus 1 basement
- Parking: 3,500 cars
- Website: www.plaza-senayan.com

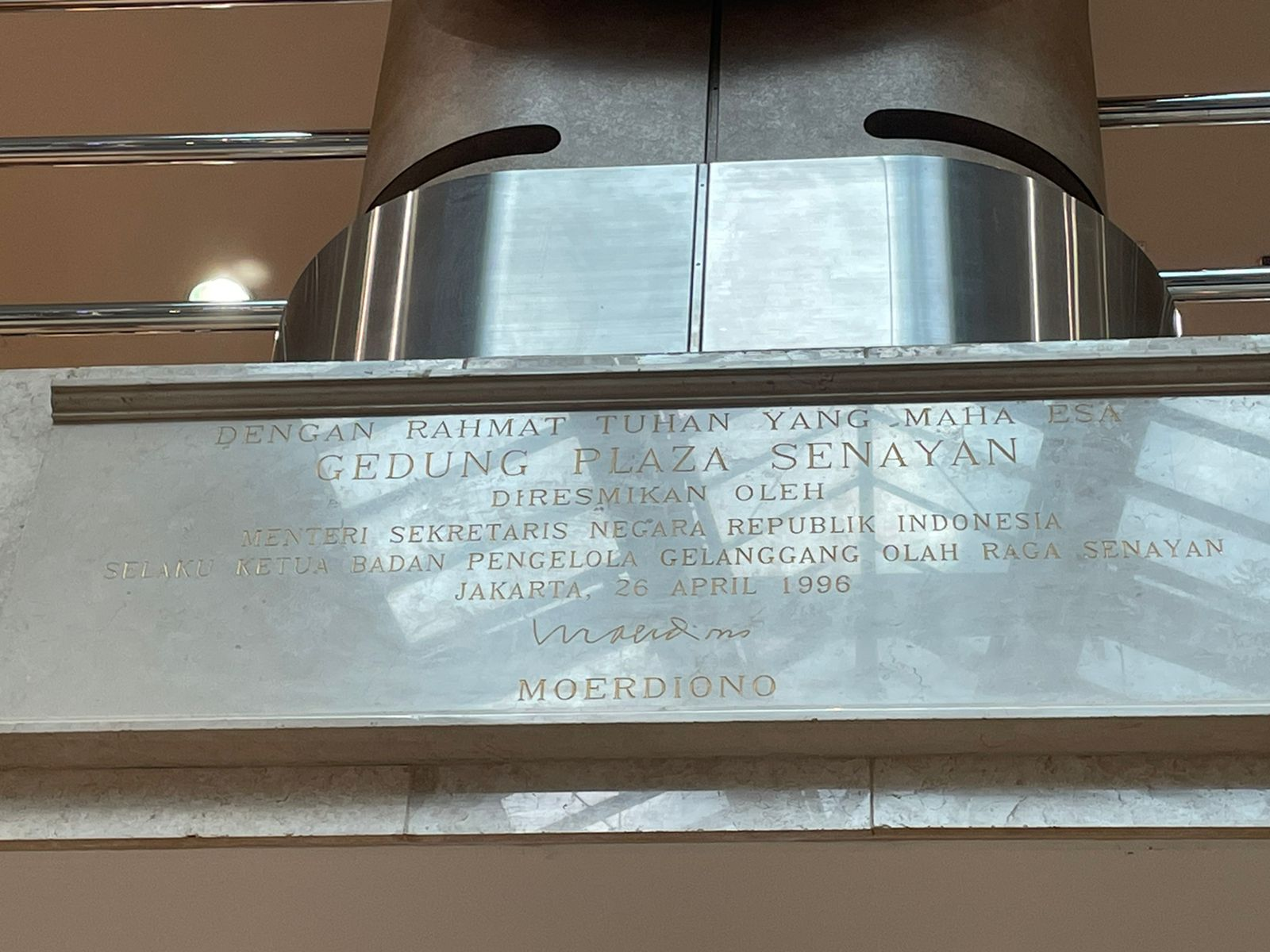
Plaza Senayan Inauguration Board

Plaza Senayan or Senayan Plaza is a shopping mall located in Central Jakarta, Indonesia. The mall is a few minutes by car from the Semanggi area; offering shops and services such as designer goods and gourmet food. In January 2017, Forbes recognized Plaza Senayan as one of the top five shopping malls in Jakarta.

== Shops and facilities ==
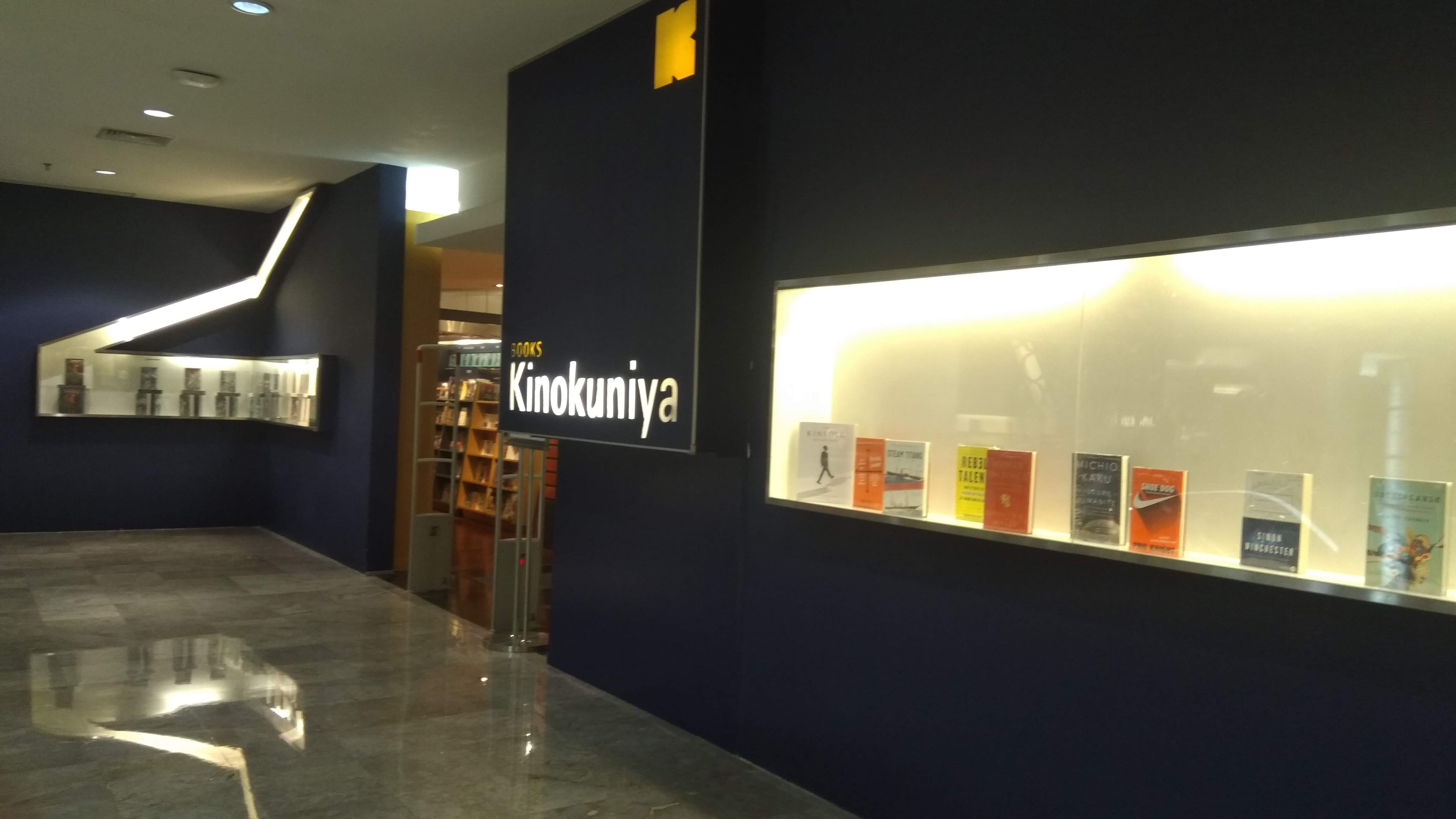
Books Kinokuniya in Plaza Senayan (to be replaced with Index Living Mall in 2021)

Plaza Senayan is a three-storey shopping mall with two interconnected department stores on its two sides, Metro Department Store at the south end and Sogo Department Store on the north. The department stores are four or five storeys with a basement. Plaza Senayan is also home to the nation's second largest foreign bookstore, Books Kinokuniya (closed in 2021, Reopened in 2024 albeit in a smaller form). after Times Bookstore in Lippo Village (Lippo Karawaci) West Jakarta.

This shopping mall is best known for its iconic Seiko-built musical clock installed in the central lobby. The clock plays its jingle at every hour and accompanied by animated musical figures moving in rhythm with the song. This musical clock is similar to those installed in many public places in Japan.

Index Living Mall announced that it will open at the fifth floor of Sogo Plaza Senayan replacing Books Kinokuniya, and its upcoming size is appx. 1.550 m2.

== See also ==
- List of shopping malls in Indonesia
