= List of shopping malls in Indonesia =

This is a partial list of notable shopping malls/shopping centres in Indonesia.

== West Java ==
=== Bandung ===
- 23 Paskal Shopping Center
- Bandung Indah Plaza
- Balubur Town Square (Baltos)
- Braga Citywalk
- Cihampelas Walk
- d'botanica Bandung
- Festival Citylink
- Istana BEC
- Istana Plaza
- ITC Kebon Kalapa
- Living Plaza Dago
- Living Plaza IBCC Bandung
- Living Plaza Paskal
- Metro Indah Mall
- Miko Mall
- Paris Van Java Mall
- Pasar Baru Trade Center
- Plaza Parahyangan
- Setrasari Mall
- Summarecon Mall Bandung
- Tenth Avenue Mall
- The Kings Shopping Centre
- Trans Studio Mall Bandung
- Ujung Berung Town Square (Ubertos)

=== Bandung Regency ===
- Thee Matic Mall

=== West Bandung Regency ===
- Bumi Hejo
- Hejo Square

=== Sumedang Regency ===
- Graha Asia
- Jatinangor Town Square
- Plaza Asia Sumedang

=== Bekasi Regency ===
- ÆON Mall Deltamas
- Ciplaz Cibitung
- Citywalk Lippo Cikarang
- District 1 Meikarta
- Milenia Hub
- Lippo Mall Cikarang
- Living Plaza Jababeka
- Living World Grand Wisata Bekasi
- Plaza Metropolitan
- Pollux Mall Cikarang
- Sentra Grosir Cikarang (SGC)

=== Bekasi ===
- Bekasi Cyber Park
- Bekasi Junction
- Bekasi Trade Center
- Blu Plaza
- BTC Mall
- Grand Galaxy Park
- Grand Metropolitan Mall
- Green Walk Mall
- Lagoon Avenue Mall Bekasi
- Living Plaza Ahmad Yani
- Living Plaza KHI Bekasi
- Mal Ciputra Cibubur
- Mega Bekasi Hypermall
- Metropolitan Mall Bekasi
- Pakuwon Mall Bekasi
- Plaza Cibubur
- Plaza Pondok Gede
- Revo Mall
- Summarecon Mall Bekasi
- Trans Park Mall Juanda

=== Bogor Regency ===
- ÆON Mall Sentul City
- Bellanova Country Mall
- Cibinong City Mall
- Cibinong City Point
- Cibinong Mall
- Cibinong Square
- Ciplaz Parung
- Living World Kota Wisata Cibubur
- Metropolitan Mall Cileungsi
- Q Square Lifestyle Park
- Vivo Mall

=== Bogor ===
- Bogor Great Mall
- Bogor Indah Plaza
- Bogor Junction
- Bogor Square
- Botani Square
- Boxies 123 Mall
- Bogor Trade World (BTW)
- Dewi Sartika Plaza
- Lippo Plaza Ekalokasari Bogor
- Lippo Plaza Keboen Raya Bogor
- Bogor Trade Mall (BTM)
- Mall The Jungle
- Plaza Jambu Dua
- Ramayana Mall Tajur
- Tajur Trade Mall
- Taman Topi Square

=== Depok ===
- Mal Cinere
- Margo City
- Trans Studio Mall Cibubur
- The Park Sawangan
- Depok Town Square

=== Cirebon ===
- Cirebon Square
- CSB Mall
- Grage City Mall
- Grage Mall
- Living Plaza Cirebon
- Pusat Grosir Cirebon
- Cirebon Mall

=== Cimahi ===
- Cimahi Mall

=== Indramayu Regency ===
- Mall Indramayu

=== Karawang Regency ===
- Resinda Park Mall
- Summarecon Villaggio Outlets
- The Grand Outlets East Jakarta – Karawang

=== Banjar ===
- Banjar Indah Plaza

== Central Java ==
=== Semarang ===
- Java Mall
- DP Mall
- Pollux Paragon Mall
- Ciputra Mall
- Queen City Mall
- Tentrem Mall
- The Park Mall Semarang
- Uptown Mall BSB City Semarang
- 23 Semarang Shopping Center (Opens Q2 2026)

== Yogyakarta ==
- Ambarrukmo Plaza
- Jogja City Mall
- Pakuwon Mall Jogja
- Sleman City Hall

== East Java ==
=== Surabaya ===
- Ciputra World
- Pakuwon Mall
- Tunjungan Plaza
- Marvell City
- Grand City Mall Surabaya
- BG Junction Surabaya
- Pakuwon City Mall
- Galaxy Mall
- Royal Plaza
- WTC Surabaya
- Lagoon Avenue Sungkono
- Plaza Surabaya
- Pasar Atom Mall
- Lenmarc Mall
- Transicon Mall Surabaya
- City of Tomorrow Mall
- Kaza Mall
- Hi-Tech Mall Surabaya
- Golden City Mall
- Maspion Square

== North Sumatra ==
=== Medan ===
- Centre Point
- Plaza Medan Fair
- Sun Plaza
- DeliPark Mall
- Thamrin Plaza
- Medan Mall
- Palladium Mall
- Ring Road City Walks Mall
- Suzuya Marelan Plaza
- Irian Marelan
- Plaza Millenium
- Manhattan Times Square
- Lippo Plaza Medan

== West Kalimantan ==
=== Singkawang ===
- Singkawang Grand Mall (SGM)

== East Kalimantan ==
=== Samarinda ===
- Samarinda Central Plaza (SCP)

== North Kalimantan ==
=== Tarakan ===
- Grand Tarakan Mall

== Bali ==
- Samasta Lifestyle Village
- Sidewalk Jimbaran
- Bali Collection
- Lippo Mall Kuta
- Discovery Mall Bali
- Beachwalk Shopping Center
- Mal Bali Galleria
- Lippo Plaza
- ICON BALI
- Plaza Renon
- Trans Studio Mall Bali
- Seminyak Village
- Level 21 Mall Bali
- Mall Bali
- Living World Denpasar
- Seminyak Village
