= SGM =

SGM, or sgm, may refer to:

== Science ==
- Second Generation Multiplex DNA profiling system - also see SGM+
- Scanning gate microscopy
- Spherical Grating Monochromator beamline of Canadian Light Source
- Semi-global matching algorithm in stereo imaging
- 16S rRNA (guanine1405-N7)-methyltransferase, an enzyme
- Sexual and Gender Minorities

== Organisations ==
- SAIC-GM, joint venture between SAIC and General Motors
- Scripture Gift Mission, London, UK
- Servicio Geológico Mexicano, the Mexican Geological Survey
- Sims Group Limited S&P/ASX 200 code
- Sociedad Geológica Mexicana, the Mexican Geological Society
- Sociedade Gestora de Fundos de Pensões Mundial, S.A., a subsidiary of Banco Internacional do Funchal
- Sovereign Grace Ministries, later Sovereign Grace Churches
- Swiss Meteorological Society (Schweizerische Gesellschaft für Meteorologie)

== Places ==
- Singkawang Grand Mall, Indonesia
- 1 SGM, a "census town" in India
- South Glamorgan, preserved county in Wales, Chapman code

== Transport ==
- Schweizer SGM 1-19, a motorized glider
- Schweizer SGM 2-37, a motorized glider
- SGM, the National Rail code for St Germans railway station, Cornwall, UK
- SGM, the IATA code for San Ignacio Airfield, Baja California Sur, Mexico
- Stadsgewestelijk Materieel, a Dutch train

== Other uses ==
- Improved Soviet SG-43 Goryunov machine gun
- Science Guard Members, in the Japanese Mirrorman (TV series)
- Sea Gallantry Medal, UK
- Sergeant Major, US military rank
- SGM, another name for the GSM blend of Australian wine
- sgm, the ISO 639-3 code for the extinct Singa language,
- Sleepytime Gorilla Museum, a band in Oakland, CA, US
- Standard Gross Margin of a farm
- Same-gender marriage
