= Sogo =

Japanese department store chain

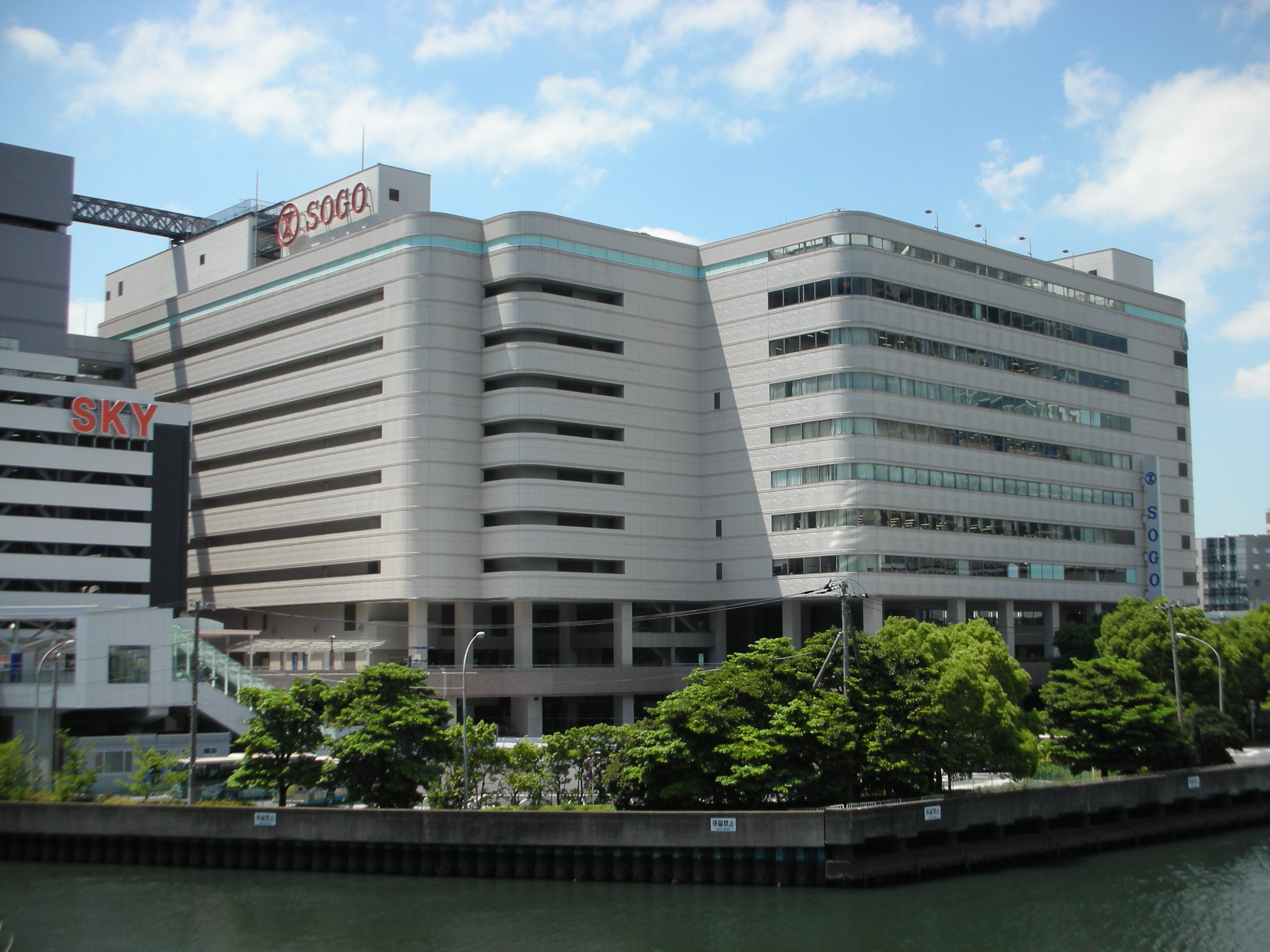
- Sogo Yokohama Department Store
- Native name: 株式会社そごう
- Romanized name: Kabushiki Gaisha Sogō
- Type: KK
- Industry: Retail
- Founded: 1830 in Osaka, Japan
- Founder: Ihei Sogo
- Headquarters: Chiyoda, Tokyo, Japan
- Number of employees: 2,845 (2006)
- Website: sogo-seibu.jp/sogo/

Sogo Co., Ltd. (株式会社そごう, Kabushiki gaisha Sogō) is a department store chain with a significant presence in Japan. It operates a network of branches in various countries and has a long history dating back to 1830 when it was founded in Osaka by Ihei Sogō. The company is known for its retail offerings, including clothing, household goods and food products.

In 2009, Sogo merged with Seibu Department Stores (The Seibu Department Stores, Ltd. (株式会社西武百貨店)), forming Sogo & Seibu Co., Ltd. (Sogo & Seibu Co., Ltd. (株式会社そごう・西武)). This merger marked the company's transition into a subsidiary of Seven & I Holdings, which also owns other well-known retail brands such as 7-Eleven.

Sogo previously owned stores in a variety of locations, including Beijing, China; Causeway Bay, Hong Kong (in the 1980s, before the Transfer of Sovereignty), Taipei, Taiwan; Jakarta and Surabaya, Indonesia; Kuala Lumpur, Malaysia; Singapore; Bangkok, Thailand; and London, United Kingdom. However, most of these international branches have since closed or are now operated by independent franchisees.

== History ==
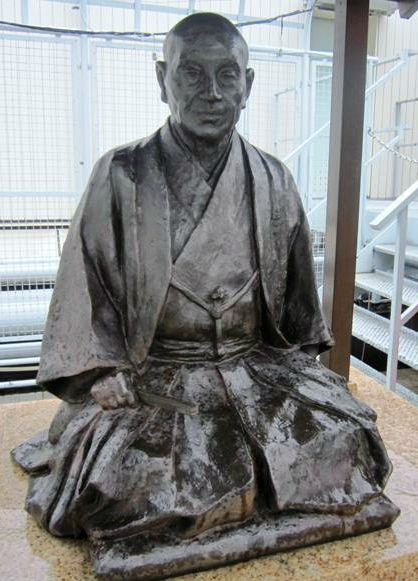
Statue of Ihei Sogō, founder of Sogo

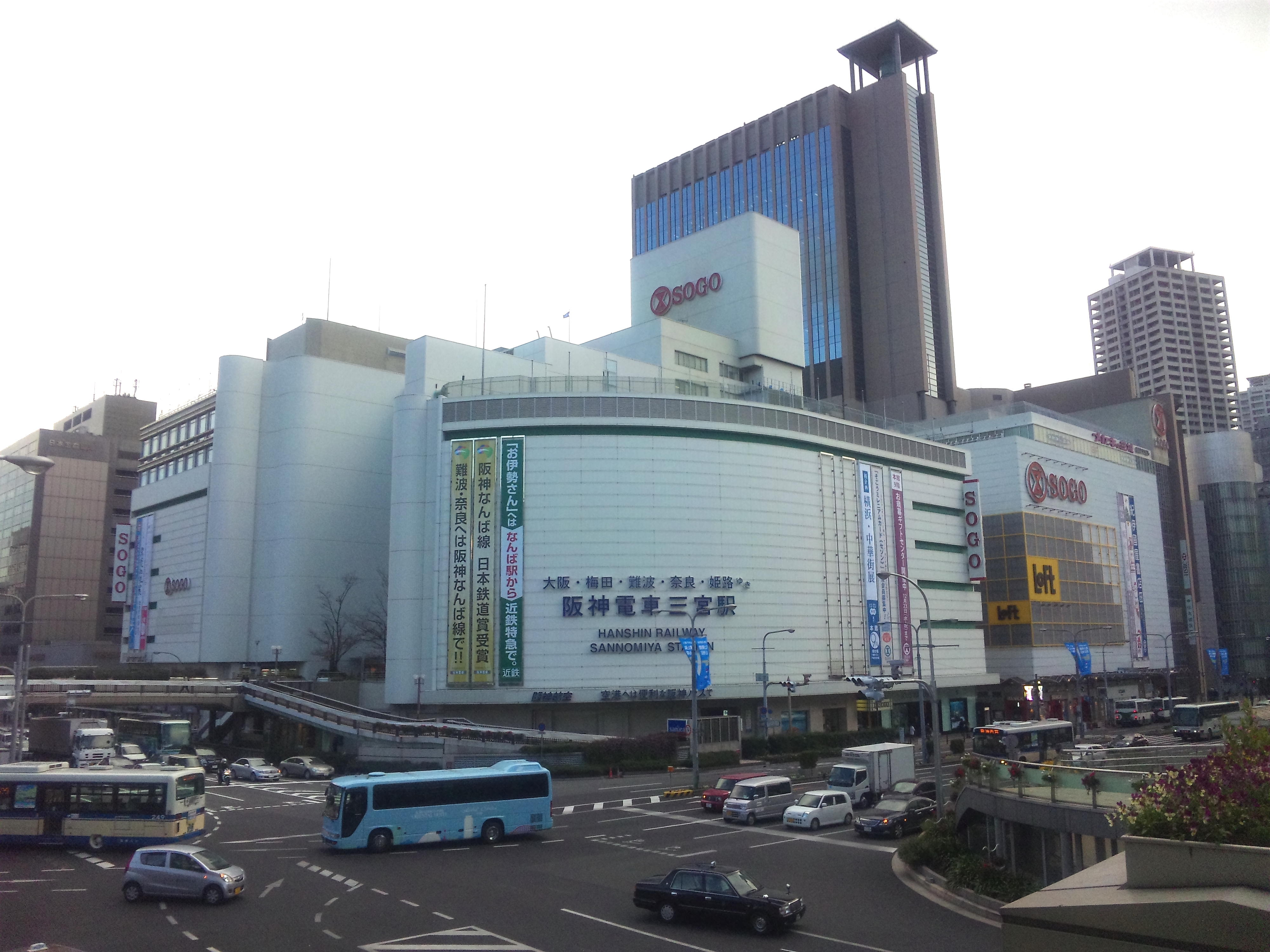
Sogo Kobe Department Store, Kobe, Hyogo (now Hankyu)

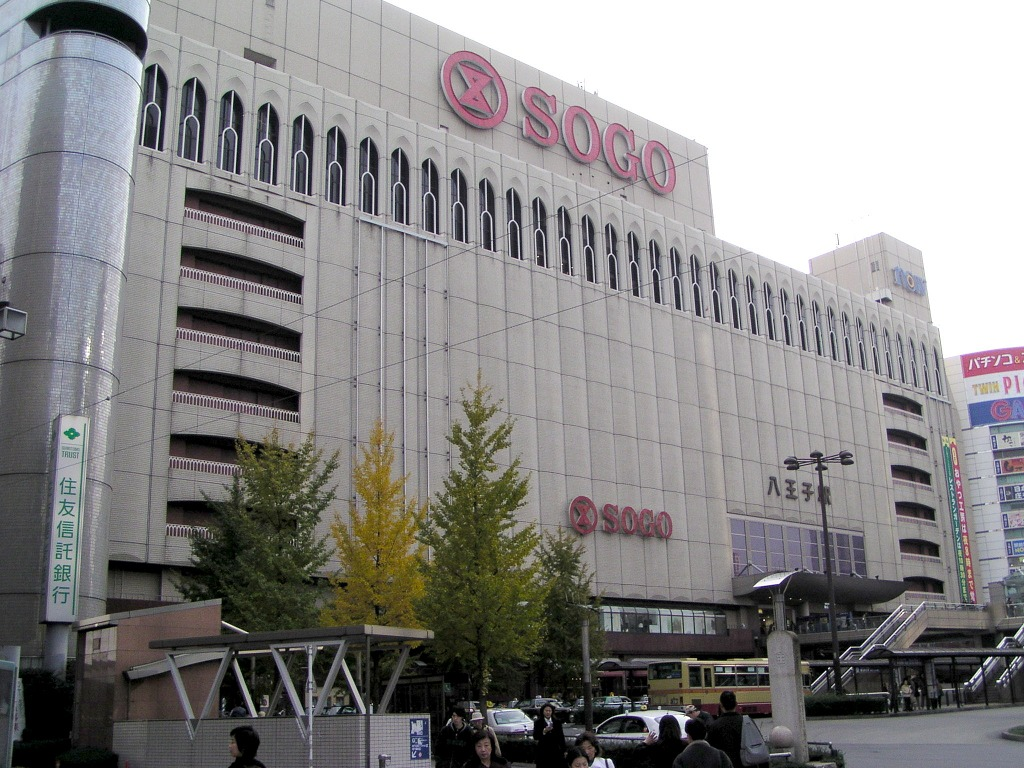
Sogo Hachioji Department Store, Hachiōji, Tokyo (now CELEO)

Sogo's origins can be traced to 1830 when it was established in Osaka as a second-hand kimono shop called "Yamatoya" in Osaka's Namba district, next to the Shima Shrine, by Ihei Sogō. Ihei was the son of Tokubei Jūgō, who had operated a silk shop in the town of Tōichi in Yamato Province. The company's initial success was driven by its family crest, a logo inspired by the silk industry, symbolizing the winding of a loom.

In 1872, Sogo transitioned from a second-hand store to a clothing retailer and moved to Andojibashi, Osaka. By 1877, the store was relocated again to Shinsaibashi and renamed Jūgō Clothing Store.

In response to growing demand from its external sales customers in the Kobe area, Sogo opened a branch in Kobe's Aioicho on June 25, 1899. This store moved to Motomachi, Kobe, on April 3, 1901. By 1933, Sogo expanded further into retail and opened a full-fledged department store in the Sannomiya Station building, making it one of the first department stores to adopt the name "Kobe Sogo."

The company underwent significant growth, and in 1935, it opened a newly designed flagship store in Shinsaibashi, Osaka, built by architect Tōgo Murano. The new store was a modernist masterpiece, featuring a beautiful glass-block facade and integrating multiple facilities such as a theater, a tea room, and VIP lounges. The Shinsaibashi store’s construction was done in two phases, with the second phase being funded by the Itaya family conglomerate, marking the end of the Jūgō family’s direct management.

In 1940, the company officially adopted the name "Jūgō" as its brand. After World War II, in 1969, it became known as "Sogo," a name that has remained in use since.

=== Wartime and post-war period ===
During World War II, the shortage of non-rationed goods led to vacant space in the Osaka store. As a result, Sogo began offering a "household property storage" service in the basement to protect customers' valuables, a service that gained popularity throughout Osaka.

After the war, the Osaka flagship store was requisitioned by the occupying forces and used as a PX (Post Exchange) store for military personnel and their families, halting normal department store operations. In response, Sogo opened stores catering to foreign residents in Osaka, including the "Overseas Surprise Store" offering imported goods.

In 1952, after a campaign led by the Japan Department Store Association to reverse the requisition, Sogo's Osaka store resumed operations on June 1. Despite the reopening, the store faced challenges, with sales struggling to recover for a year due to the long hiatus. Moreover, the company faced additional difficulties with low stock prices, leading to a period of hostile stock buying attempts by external investors. This tumultuous period set the stage for Sogo’s eventual transformation into one of Japan’s leading department store chains.

=== 1957 – 1985: expansion into Tokyo, Chiba and Yokohama ===
Sogo operated its headquarters in Shinsaibashi, Osaka, for many years, maintaining a strong presence in the city. The company had only two stores, in Shinsaibashi, Osaka and Sannomiya, Kobe, until 1957, when it opened a store in Yurakucho, Tokyo. This expansion was promoted with the slogan "Let’s Meet in Yurakucho," which became a cultural phenomenon, thanks in part to a popular song and various media productions. Both the Osaka and Tokyo stores were used for filming, with Sogo also providing costumes for these productions.

In 1967, the company launched its Chiba Sogo store, which became a major success. This led to a rapid expansion of stores in the Tokyo metropolitan area, particularly along National Route 16 in suburban stations. The company’s capital structure was complex, with regional subsidiaries funded by Chiba Sogo. Prior to its bankruptcy, Sogo operated only three directly-managed stores in Osaka (Shinsaibashi), Kobe (Sannomiya), and Tokyo (Yurakucho), with other stores operated by regional subsidiaries in which Chiba Sogo had invested.

By 1985, Sogo had opened its Yokohama store, which became the largest Sogo store in terms of sales and floor space, covering 83,654 square meters. At its peak, Sogo operated more than 30 stores worldwide and surpassed Mitsukoshi and Takashimaya in sales in 1992, becoming the leading department store group in Japan.

=== 1990s – 2000: Financial difficulties and bankruptcy ===
Despite its expansions, the company faced severe financial troubles in the 1990s following the collapse of Japan’s economic bubble and the decline in real estate prices that began in the mid-1980s, which led to its bankruptcy in 2000. In July 2000, Sogo’s financial difficulties were primarily attributed to the unstable real estate investment strategies of its former chairman, Hiroo Mizushima, compounded by the effects of the bubble’s collapse. The company accumulated around US$17 billion in debt, largely owed to the Industrial Bank of Japan. As a result, Sogo filed for bankruptcy protection under the Civil Rehabilitation Law on July 12, 2000, at the Osaka District Court.

In response to its financial troubles, Sogo divested several unprofitable units and valuable assets, including stores in Japan (e.g., Kokura and Kurosaki) and international locations in cities like Singapore, Kuala Lumpur, Hong Kong, and Taipei.

The company was restructured with support from Seibu Department Stores, merging with Seibu in 2003 under the holding company Millennium Retailing, marking a significant turning point.

Despite these challenges, Sogo remains a key player in the Japanese retail sector, operating as a subsidiary of Millennium Retailing, later rebranded as Sogo & Seibu, under the ownership of Seven & I Holdings. Several overseas stores continued as independent franchises, helping raise additional capital.

== Locations ==
Sogo once operated stores in various international locations, including Beijing, Taipei, Jakarta, Kuala Lumpur, Singapore, Hong Kong, and London. However, many of these overseas stores have since closed, with some being operated under independent franchises.

=== Japan ===
As of 2018, Sogo Department Store has locations in Yokohama, Chiba, Hiroshima, Omiya, Kawaguchi, Seishin and Tokushima.

In August 2020, Sogo closed its stores in Seishin and Tokushima, followed by the closing of the Kawaguchi store in February 2021 due to declining sales.

Kanto region	Kansai & Chugoku region
Saitama (Omiya)	Hiroshima (Hiroshima)
Chiba (Chiba)	
Kanagawa (Yokohama)	

=== China ===
Sogo Department stores in China are operated by Taiwan-based Pacific Sogo. Stores are located in Beijing, three in Shanghai, two in Chengdu, two in Chongqing and one in Dalian, as of August 2007. It appears that all of the branches have shut down.

==== Jiuguang Department Store ====
In 2004, Jiuguang Department Store in Shanghai was opened as a joint venture between Lifestyle International Holdings of Hong Kong, the owner of Sogo Hong Kong and the state-owned Joinbuy Group of Shanghai. The department store is located in the fashionable Jing'an District adjacent to the Jing'an Temple, on West Nanjing Road. The store operation is a clone of the Sogo in Hong Kong including the high-end supermarket Freshmart and Beaute @ Jiuguang (instead of Beaute @ Sogo).

The store also stocked several luxury designer brands, some of which opened their first counters in mainland China there, including Thomas Pink, Jean Paul Gaultier and Vivienne Westwood. In addition to Shanghai, Jiuguang has opened stores in Suzhou and Dalian.

=== Hong Kong ===
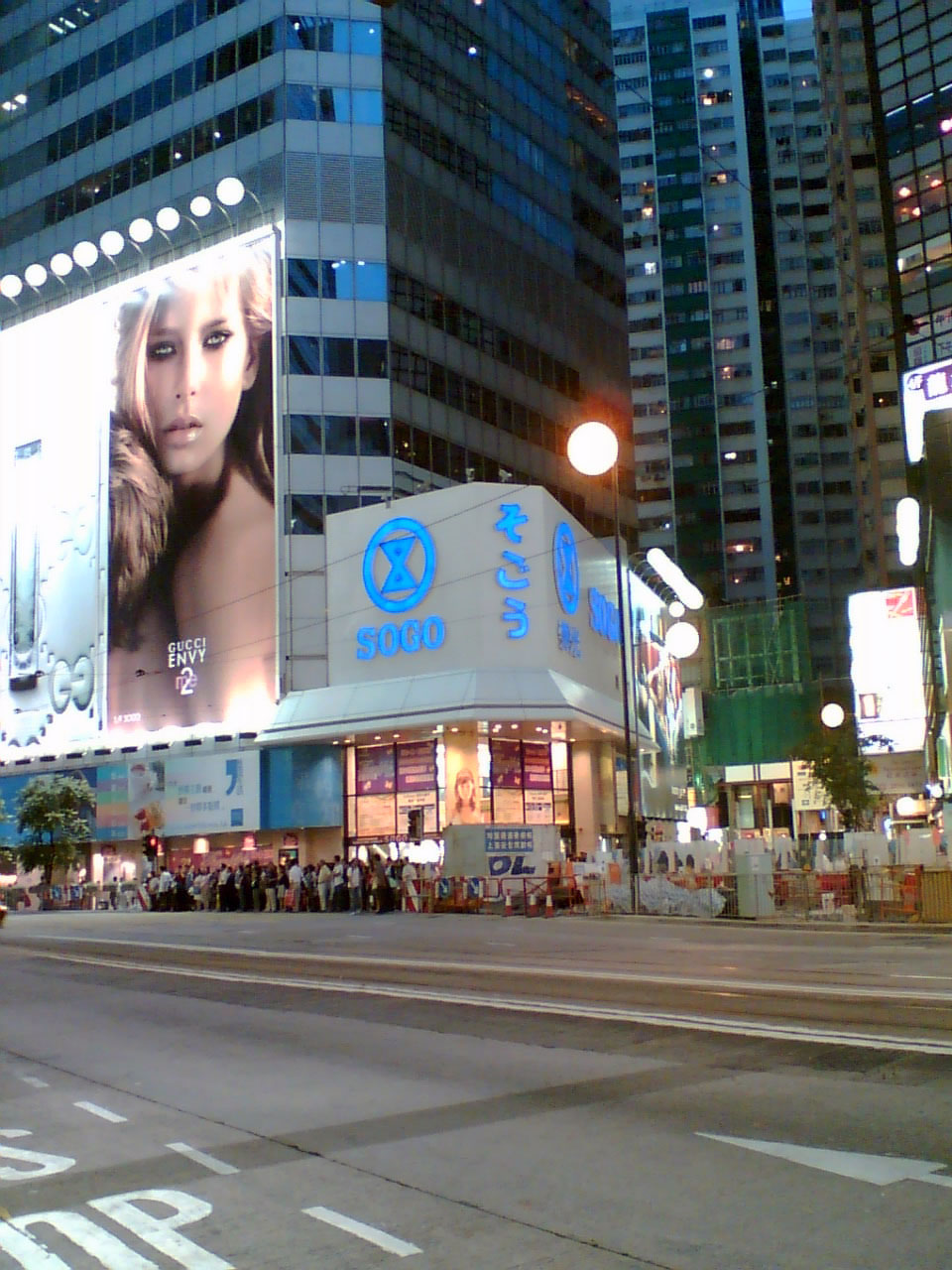
Sogo's store in Causeway Bay, Hong Kong

The Causeway Bay store on Hong Kong Island opened in 1985. The store itself was colloquially referred as "Jumbo Sogo" after its subsequent expansion.

Following Sogo Group's collapse and bankruptcy in Japan after the Asian financial crisis, Sogo Hong Kong, including the 40,500-square-meter retail property located in Causeway Bay, was sold for US$453.6 million to two local billionaires, Thomas Lau of Chinese Estates and Henry Cheng of Chow Tai Fook Enterprises. The new owners took Sogo public with the help of Lifestyle International in 2004.

Sogo Hong Kong Co. Ltd, the Sogo franchisee, now operates one additional store in Tsim Sha Tsui, which opened on September 30, 2005, marking the 25th anniversary of Sogo in Hong Kong. The Causeway Bay store added a large extension, which opened on November 22, 1993. The enlarged store carries items in all product categories across the 15-story building. It includes the Sogo Club, Sogo Book club, and a new annex building named Beauté by Sogo. The Tsim Sha Tsui branch focuses on designer fashions.

Lifestyle International Holdings Limited, the holding company of Sogo, was listed on The Stock Exchange of Hong Kong Limited on 15 April 2004. It is a member of the International Association of department stores.

=== Indonesia ===
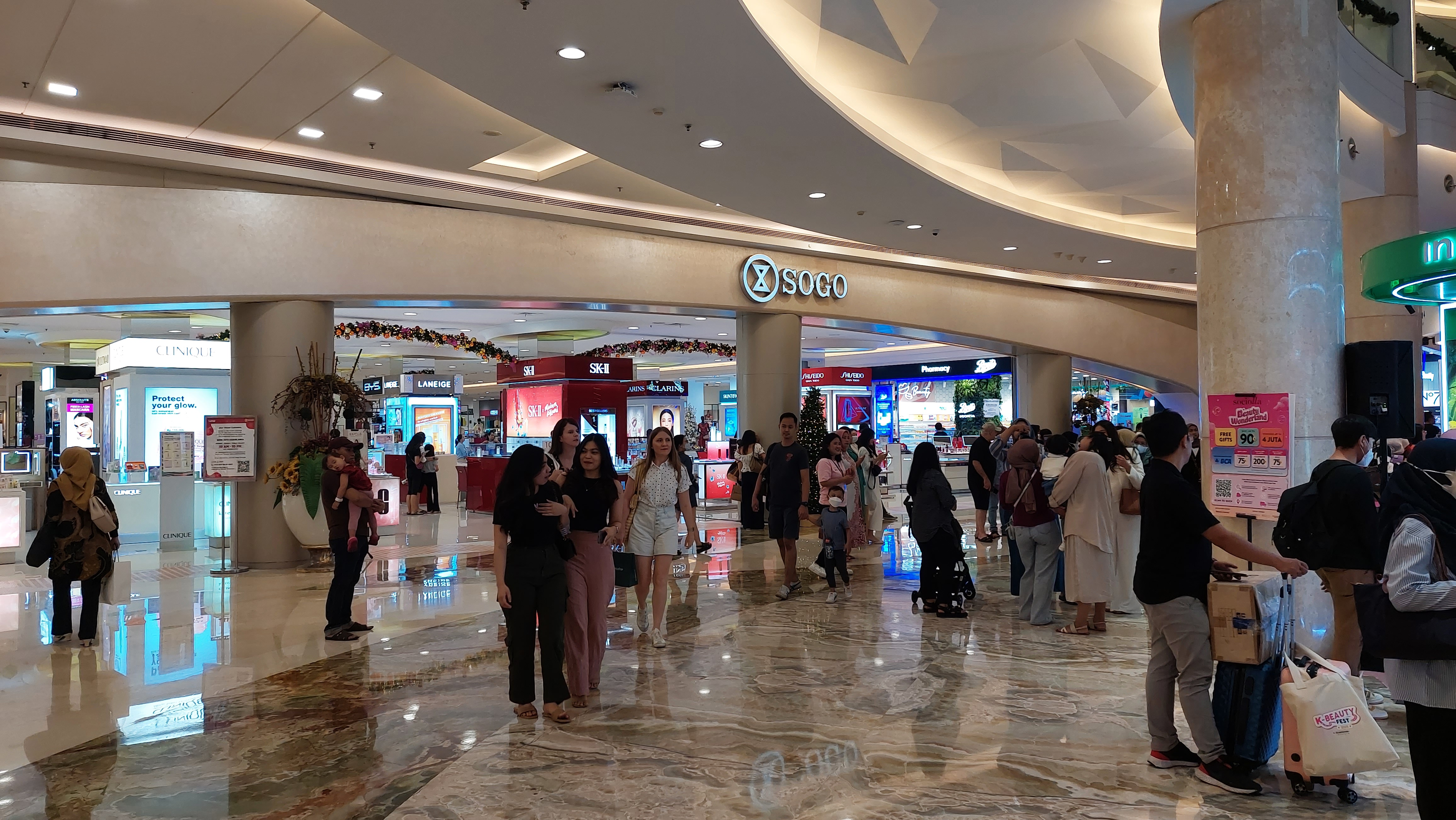
Sogo's store in Kota Kasablanka, Jakarta

In Indonesia, Sogo is operated by PT Mitra Adiperkasa Tbk (which also operates Sogo's sister department store chain Seibu) through its subsidiary PT Panen Lestari Indonesia (which was acquired by Mitra Adiperkasa in 2003). The first Indonesia Sogo store was opened in 1990 at Plaza Indonesia. The store was later closed in February 2006 due to the renovation of the shopping mall. The Sogo flagship store and management office were moved to Plaza Senayan, currently the largest store with six levels. All stores are located in high-end shopping malls in Indonesia, listed below.

Jakarta	Tangerang	Bandung	Surabaya	Bali	Borneo	Medan
Plaza Senayan	Supermal Karawaci	Paris van Java	Tunjungan Plaza 4	Discovery Shopping Mall	Big Mall Samarinda	Sun Plaza
Pondok Indah Mall 2			Galaxy Mall 2	Bali Collection	Central Park Borneo Bay City	Deli Park
Mal Kelapa Gading 3			Pakuwon Mall			
Emporium Pluit Mall						
Central Park						
Kota Kasablanka						
Lippo Mall Puri						

PT. Mitra Adiperkasa Tbk., commonly known as MAP, also operated supermarket The Foodhall, previously known as Sogo Supermarket. The Sogo Supermarket brand, introduced in Plaza Indonesia since its opening in 1990, has been phased out progressively with the introduction of the Sogo Foodhall as a modern supermarket concept, before renaming it into The Foodhall Gourmet as Sogo Plaza Indonesia closed down. The first new concept store opened in 2005 in conjunction with the opening of its Pondok Indah Mall branch, and eventually evolved into The Foodhall today. The supermarket that operated as part of Sogo are located below.

Jakarta
Plaza Senayan
Pondok Indah Mall 2
Mal Kelapa Gading 3
Lippo Mall Puri

The Foodhall is also located in Senayan City (as part of now closed Debenhams department store), Grand Indonesia (as part of Seibu department store), and Central Park's extension, Neo Soho Mall (renamed as Central Park 2 in 2025). Other branches of The Foodhall are either standalone, operating independently inside a mall without any MAP-operated department stores, or operated under Daily Supermarket brand. Unlike The Foodhall for upper-class consumers, Daily Supermarket is operated for middle-class consumers. Daily Supermarket opened as part of Sogo on Paris Van Java in 2014, despite located in its extension.

Sogo stores that did not include the supermarket are listed below:

Jakarta	Tangerang	Borneo	Medan	Surabaya	Bali
Central Park	Supermal Karawaci	Big Mall Samarinda	Sun Plaza	Tunjungan Plaza	Discovery Shopping Mall
Kota Kasablanka			Deli Park	Galaxy Mall	Bali Collection
Emporium Pluit Mall				Pakuwon Mall	

Some stores also feature Planet Sports, Kidz Station (both MAP's inhouse brands), Sports Direct, Marks & Spencer, Mango, Starbucks, Paul, and Chatterbox Cafe. A Books Kinokuniya store was used to be located in the upper level of Sogo Plaza Senayan as its Indonesian flagship store, but closed on April 1, 2021, later reopened in a smaller scale.

=== Malaysia ===
Sogo presently has four stores in Malaysia. The first store, known as KL Sogo, is located along Jalan Tuanku Abdul Rahman in downtown Kuala Lumpur. Connected to the Bandaraya LRT station by a link bridge, it sits on the site formerly occupied by Suleiman Courts. Then one of the two mega retail projects in Kuala Lumpur and originally a joint venture with Pernas, KL Sogo commenced business on 18 January 1994. It has a basement parking for visitors to park their car.

Sogo's second store in Malaysia, located at the Central i-City shopping mall in Padang Jawa, Shah Alam, opened on 11 April 2019, followed by the third store at The Mall - Midvalley Southkey in Johor Bahru, opened on 23 April 2019.

The operator, Sogo (KL) Department Store Sdn Bhd, also announced plans to open new stores in Paragon @ KL Northgate in Selayang, and GEM Megamall in Seberang Perai, Penang. It also plans to open a Seibu store in Tun Razak Exchange (TRX) Lifestyle Quarter in Kuala Lumpur, which eventually opened on 29 November 2023.

Sogo also has been appointed to manage the operations of Mayang Mall in Kuala Terengganu, as well as becoming the mall's anchor tenant. Mayang Mall opened on 5 December 2024 as its fourth outlet with 100,000 square feet (9,300 m^{2}) of space.

State	Stores
(Federal Territories of Malaysia) W.P. Kuala Lumpur	2
Selangor	1
Johor	1
Terengganu	1

=== Singapore ===
Sogo opened a branch at Raffles City in 1986. In 1993, Sogo opened another store at new shopping mall Tampines Centre as its anchor tenant. The Tampines Centre's store closed in 1998 as Sogo continued to make losses in Singapore. Sogo also once anchored Orchard Road's Paragon. Both stores at Paragon and Raffles City closed in October 2000 due to the bankruptcy of Sogo Japan.

=== Taiwan ===
In Taiwan, Far East Sogo, as a part of Far East Group operates 8 stores. The oldest of these is located at Zhongxiao Fuxing Station in Taipei.

In 2006, Pacific Sogo found itself in the midst of a corruption scandal over gift certificates involving the family of Taiwan's former President Chen Shui-Bian. In October 2006, Wu Shu-chen (the former President's wife) was cleared by court of accepting vouchers from Pacific Sogo in return for her influence.

Due to its ownership, Pacific Sogo brand was renamed into Far East Sogo in 2016, while the corporate name is still named Pacific Sogo Department Stores Co., Ltd. The company targeted Far East Sogo for middle-up to high-end customers, alongside its flagship brand, Far Eastern Department Stores, targeted for low-middle and middle customers, and The Mall, targeted for high-end customers.

Kuang San Sogo, located in Taichung, is not related to Pacific Sogo.

== Logo ==
Since its inception, Sogo has used a logo based on the family crest (mon (emblem)) of a silk shop. The design — a circle with a shape inside — reflects the company’s origins in the kimono industry and symbolizes the act of winding a loom (called chikiri in Japanese). In Japanese, the word "chikiri" also refers to the act of taking a vow or making a promise.

== Gallery ==
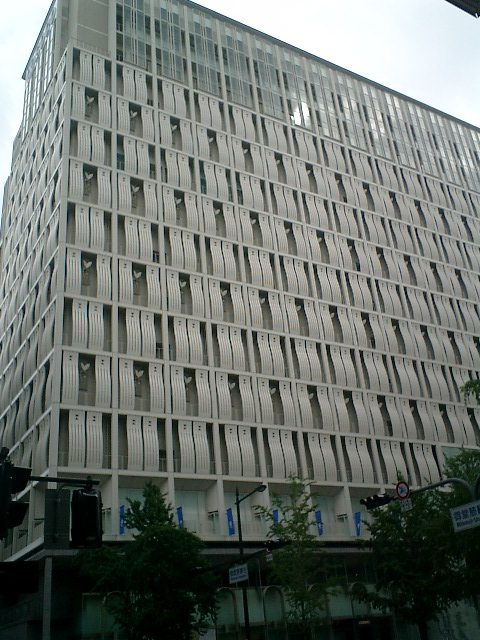
SOGO-Shinsaibashi 1, Osaka, now Daimaru

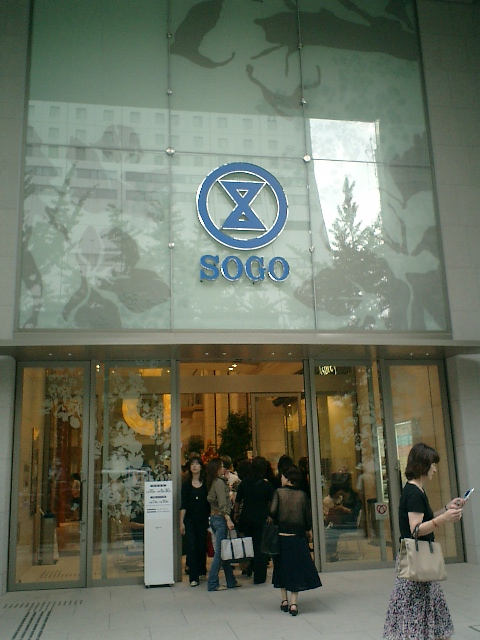
SOGO-Shinsaibashi 2, Osaka, now Daimaru

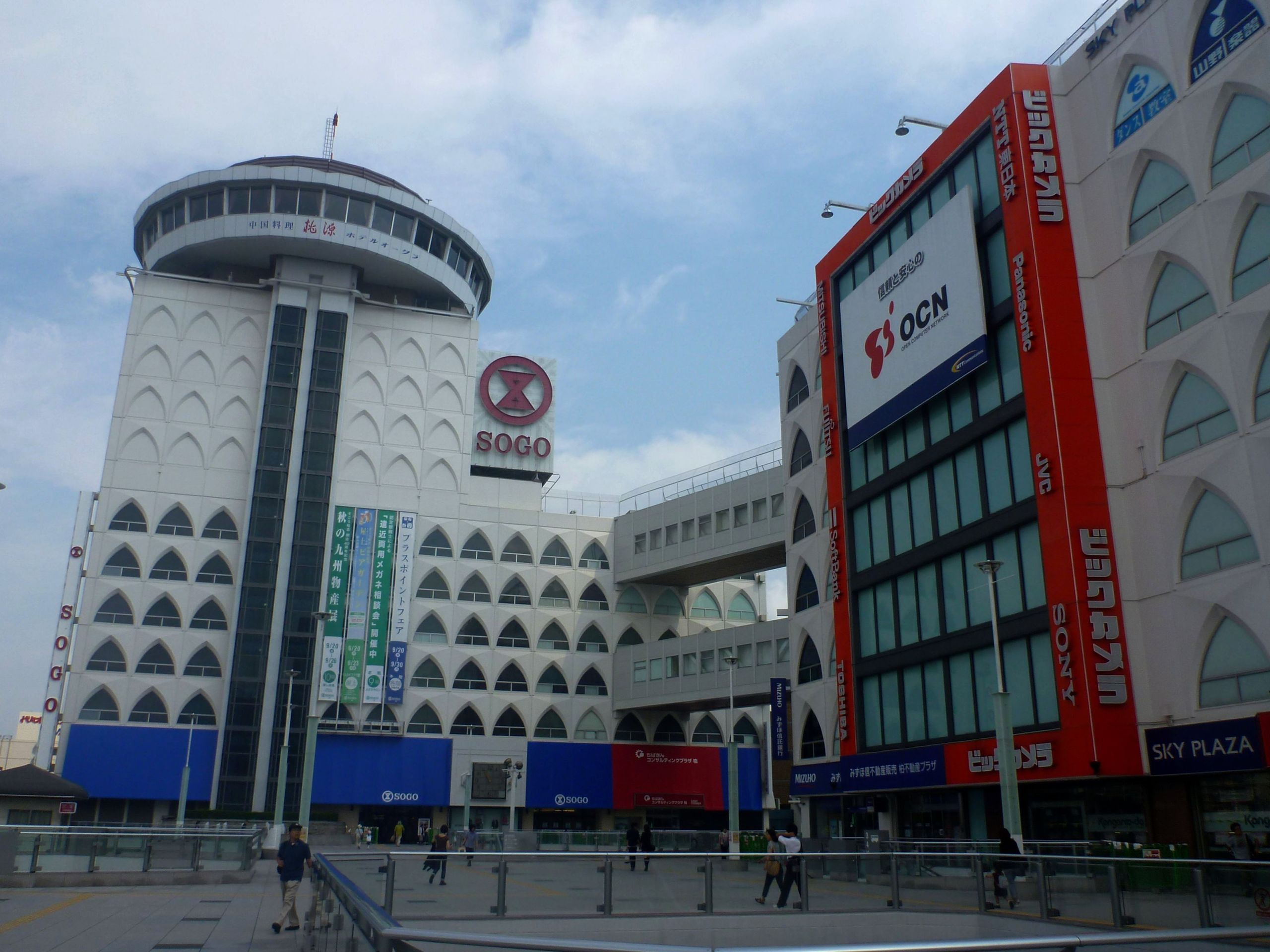
SOGO-Kashiwa, Chiba

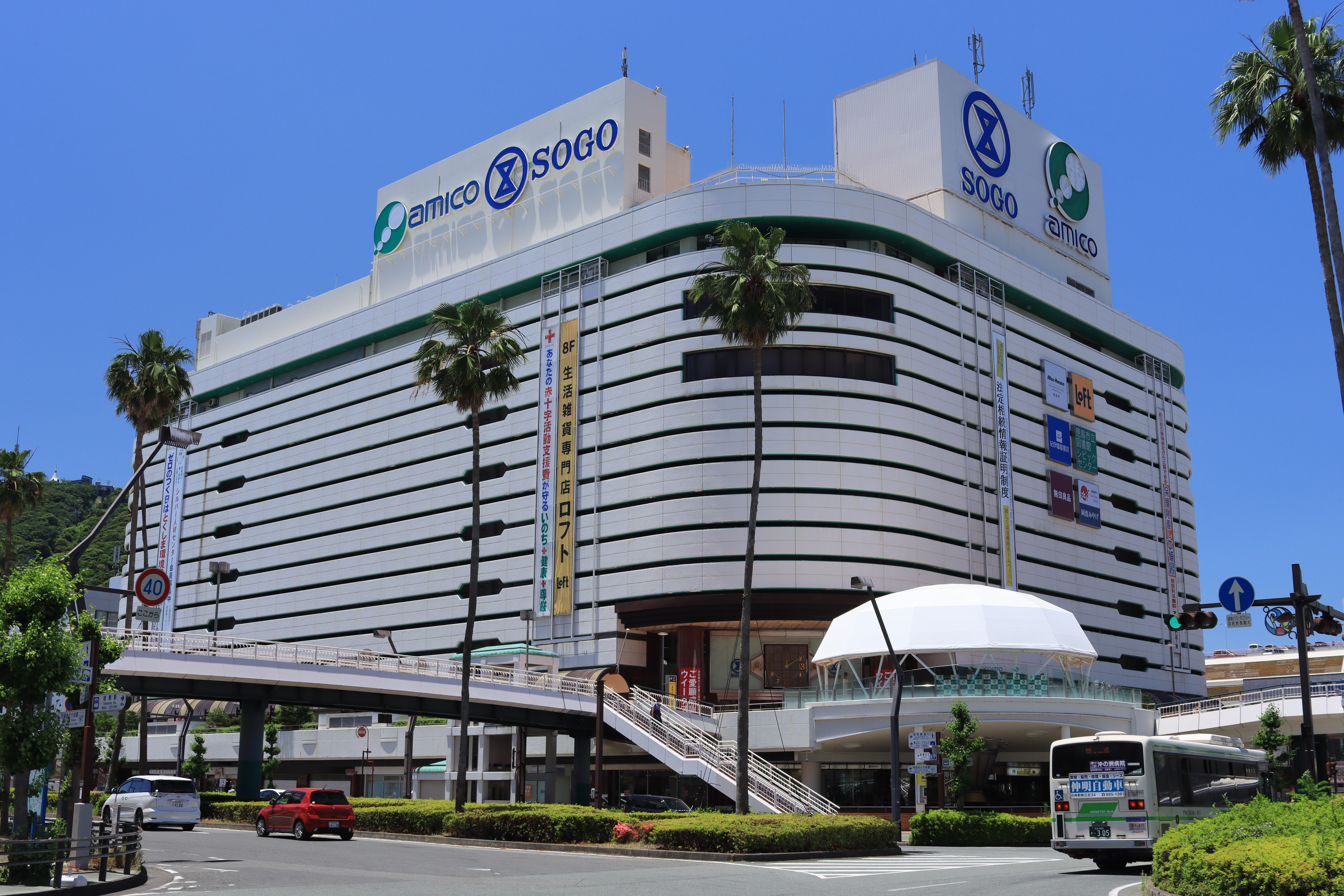
SOGO-Tokushima, Tokushima

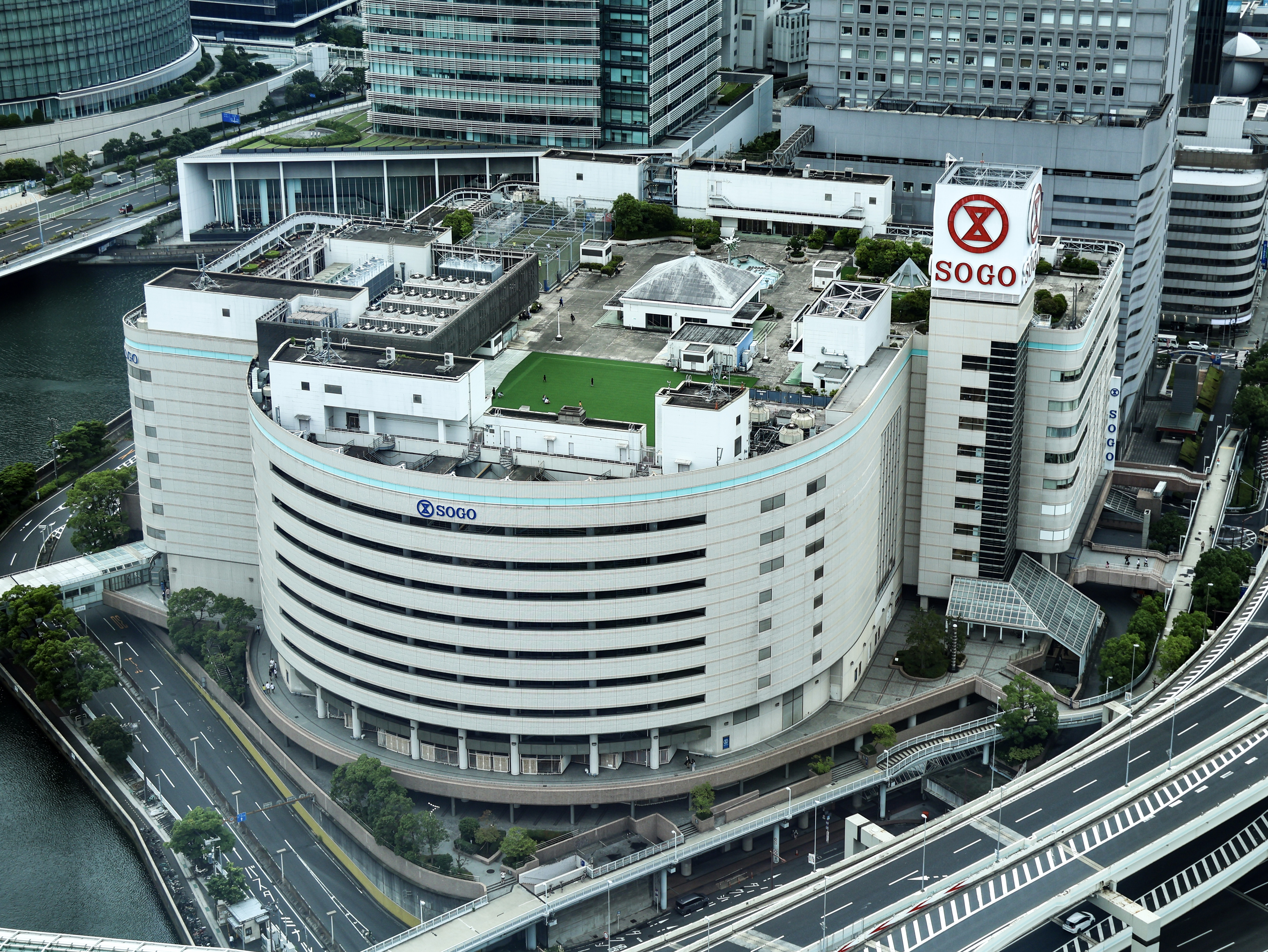
SOGO-Yokohama, Kanagawa

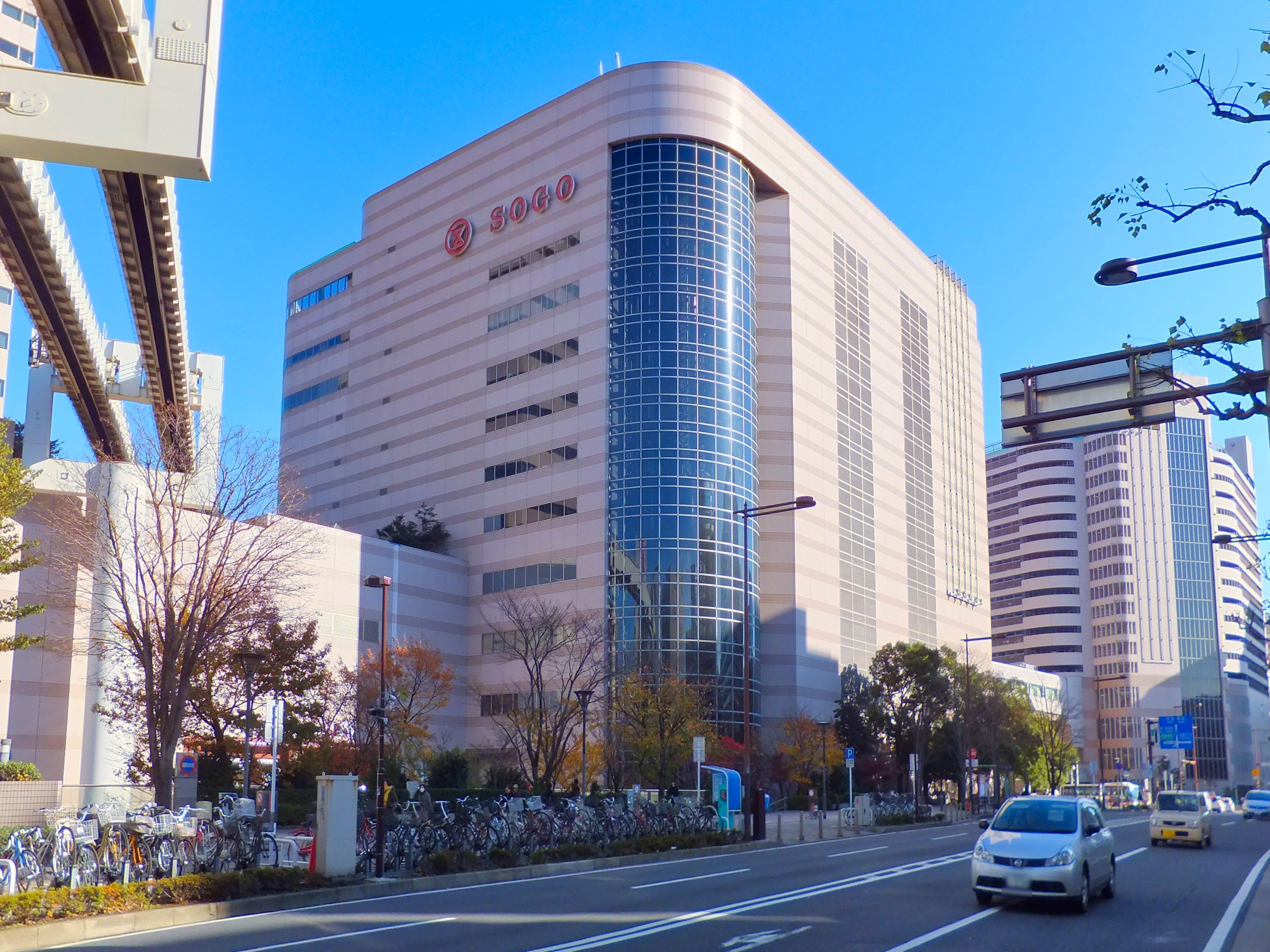
SOGO-Chiba, Chiba

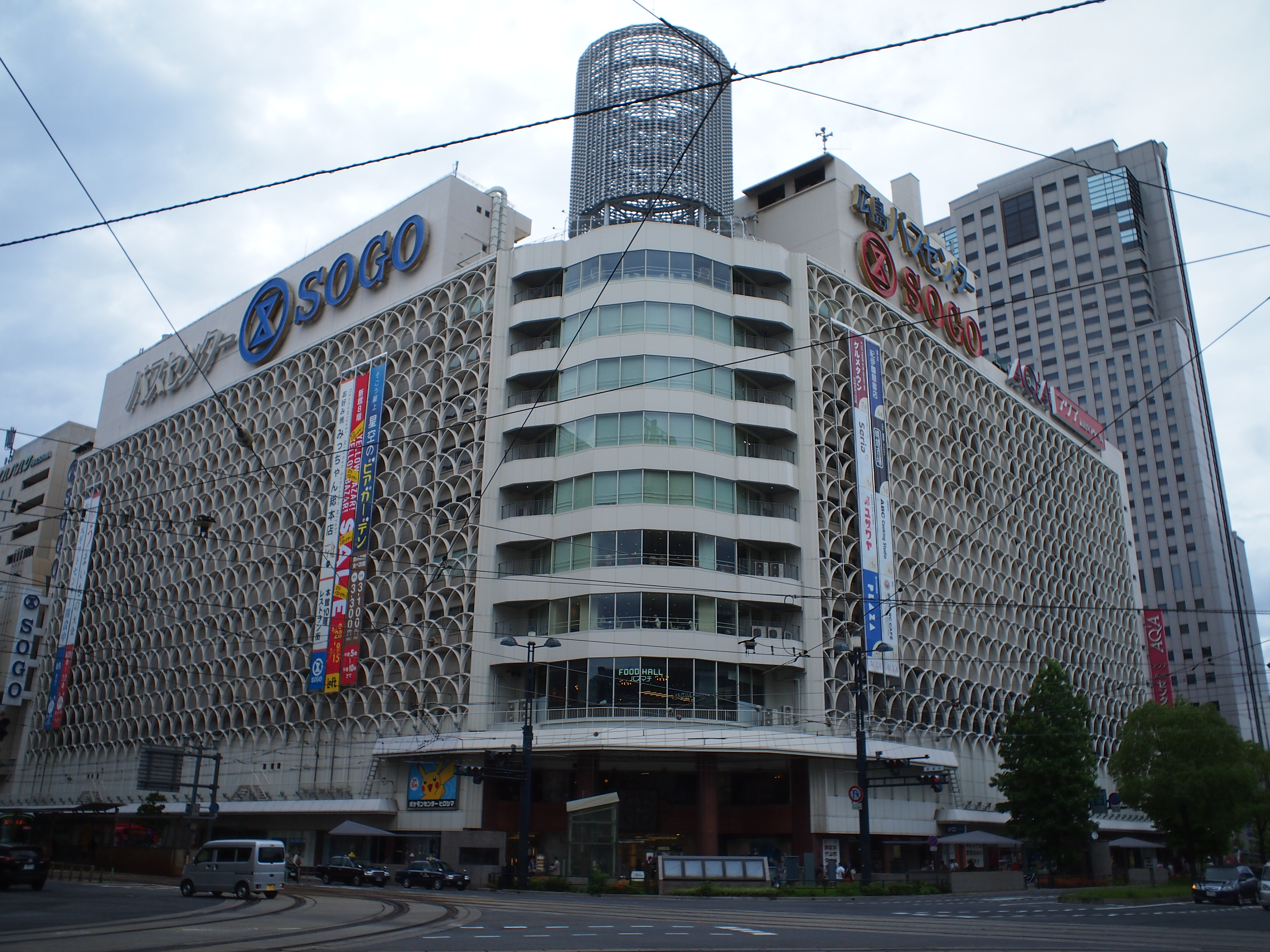
SOGO-Hiroshima, Hiroshima

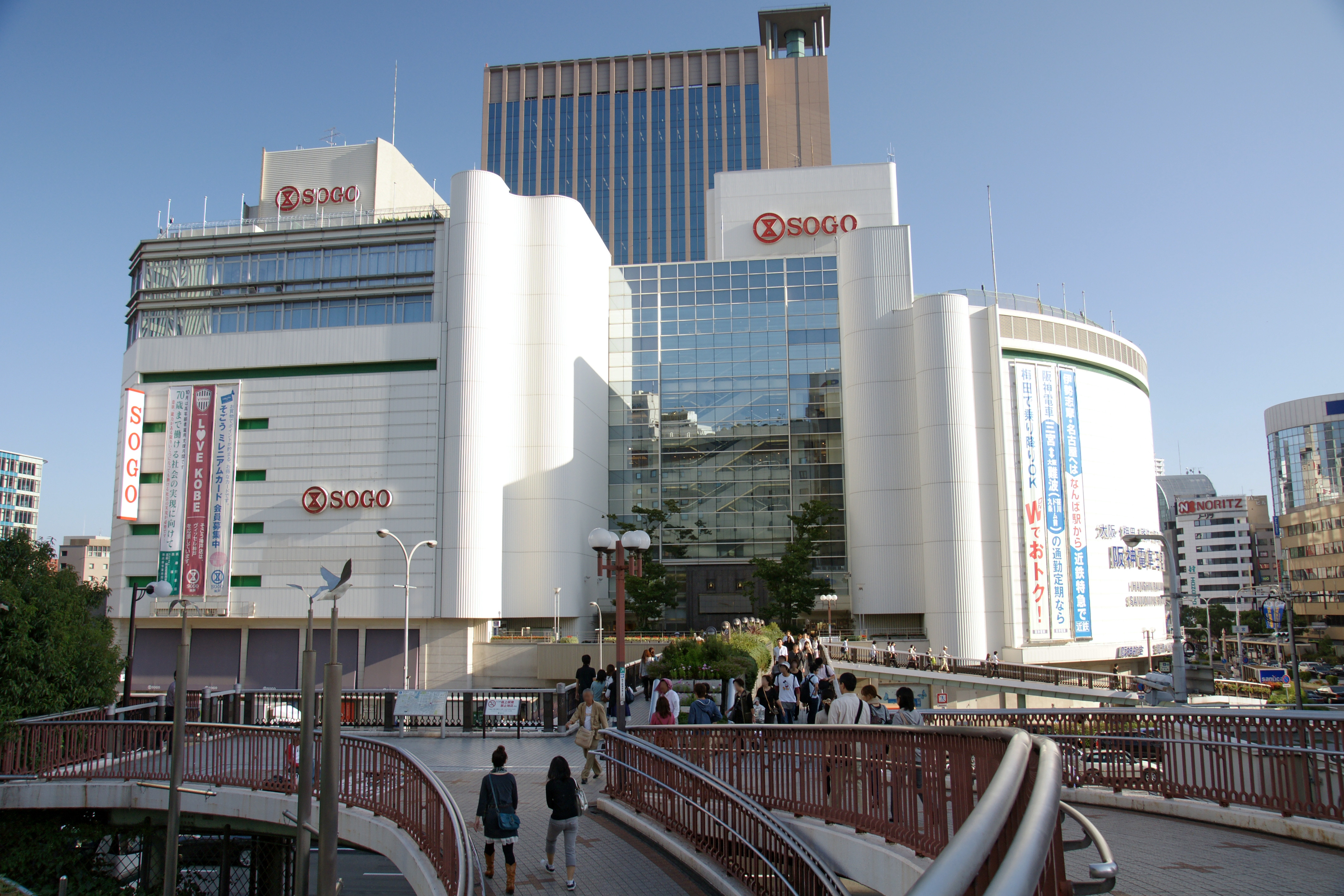
SOGO-Kobe, Hyogo, now Kōbe Hankyū

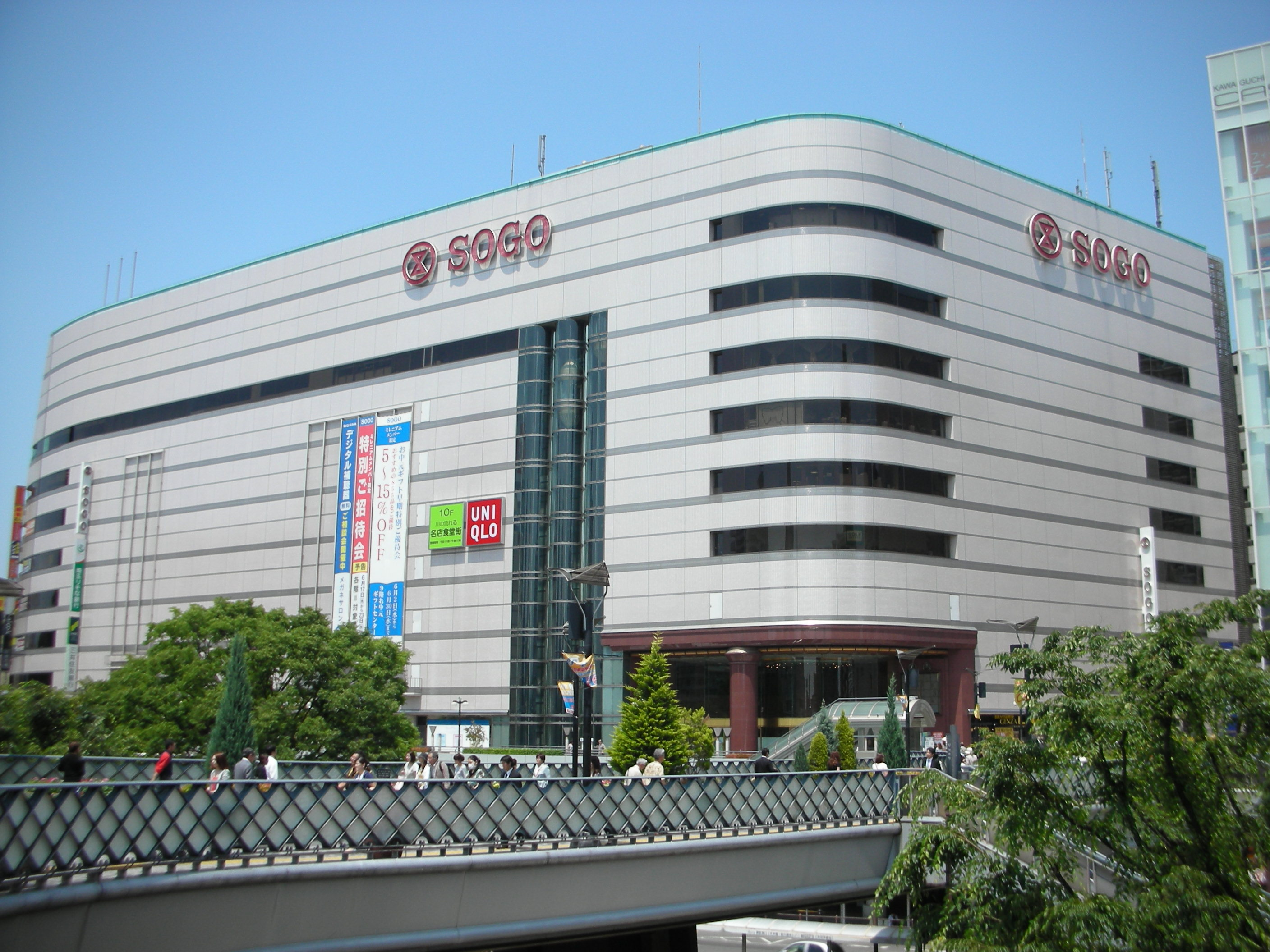
SOGO-Kawaguchi, Saitama

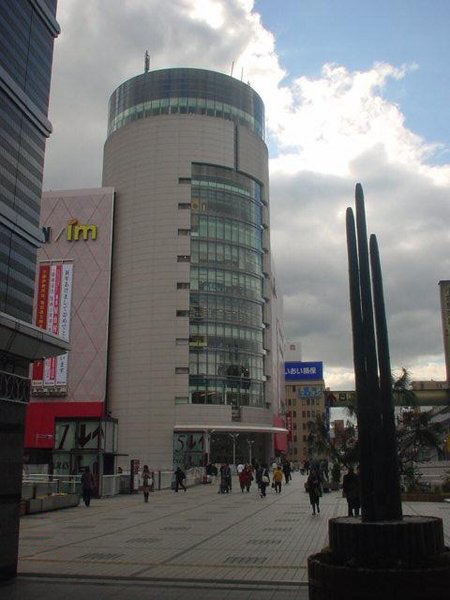
The former Sogo in Kokura, later Isetan (now Colet)

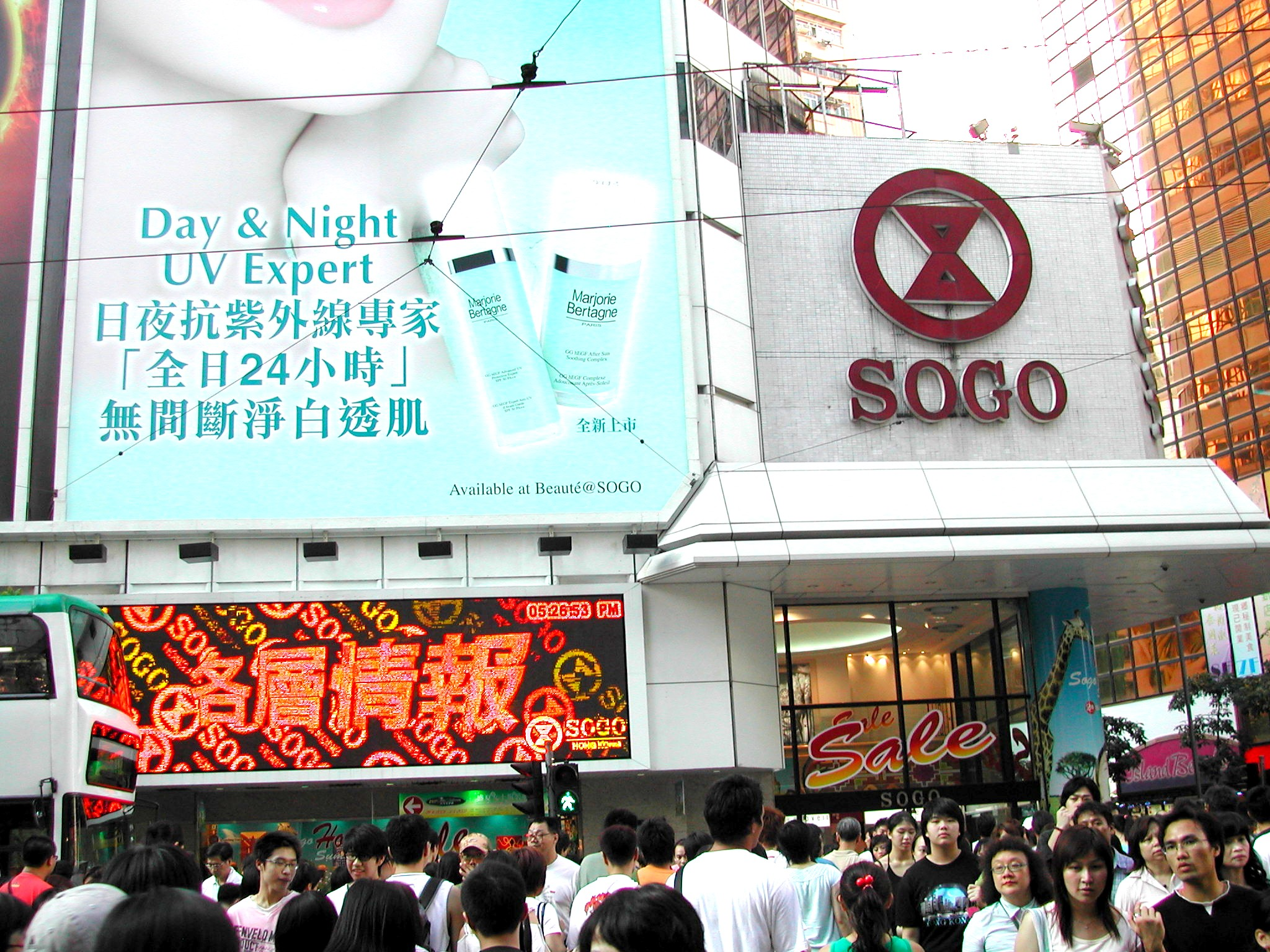
SOGO-Causeway Bay, Hong Kong

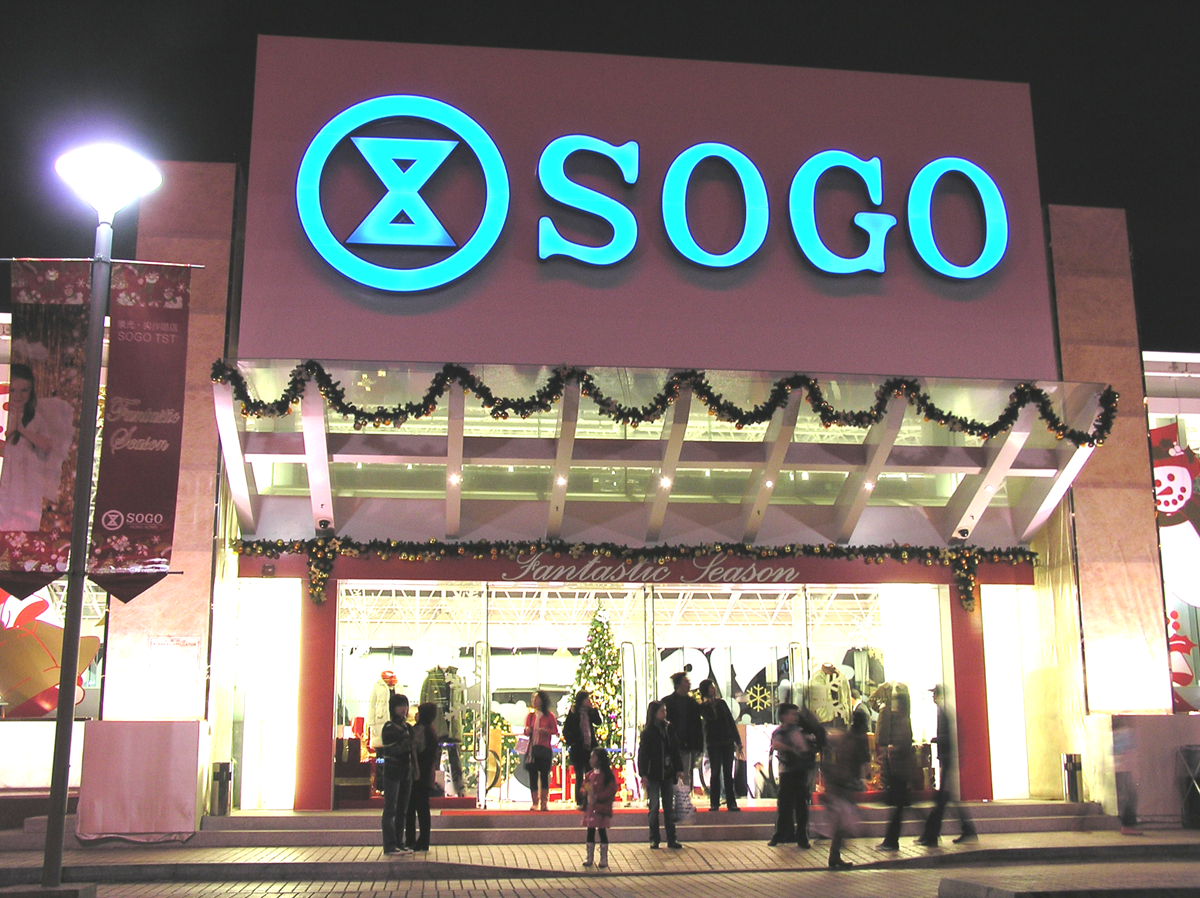
SOGO-Tsim Sha Tsui, Hong Kong

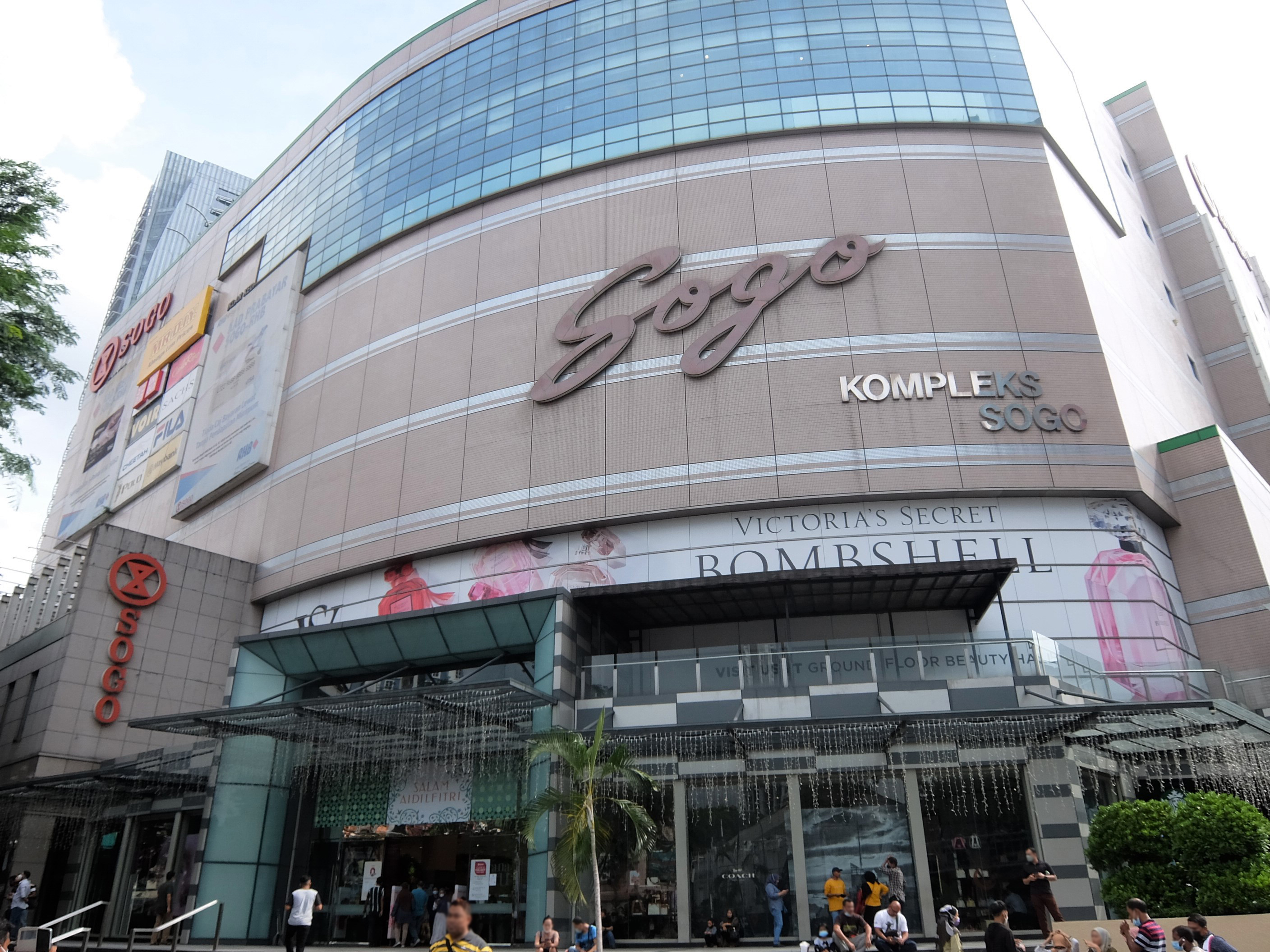
SOGO Kuala Lumpur, Malaysia

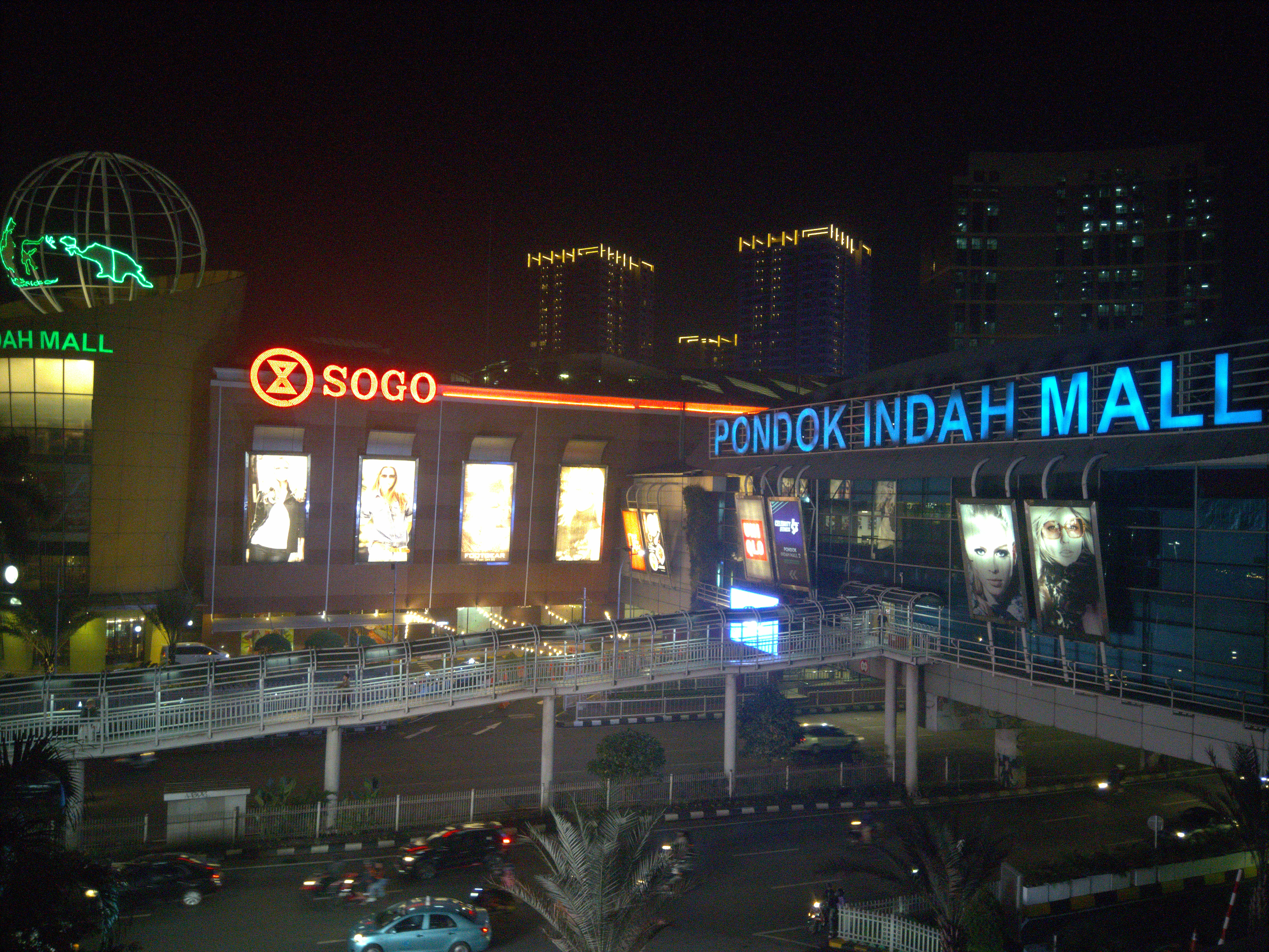
SOGO Pondok Indah Mall, Jakarta, Indonesia

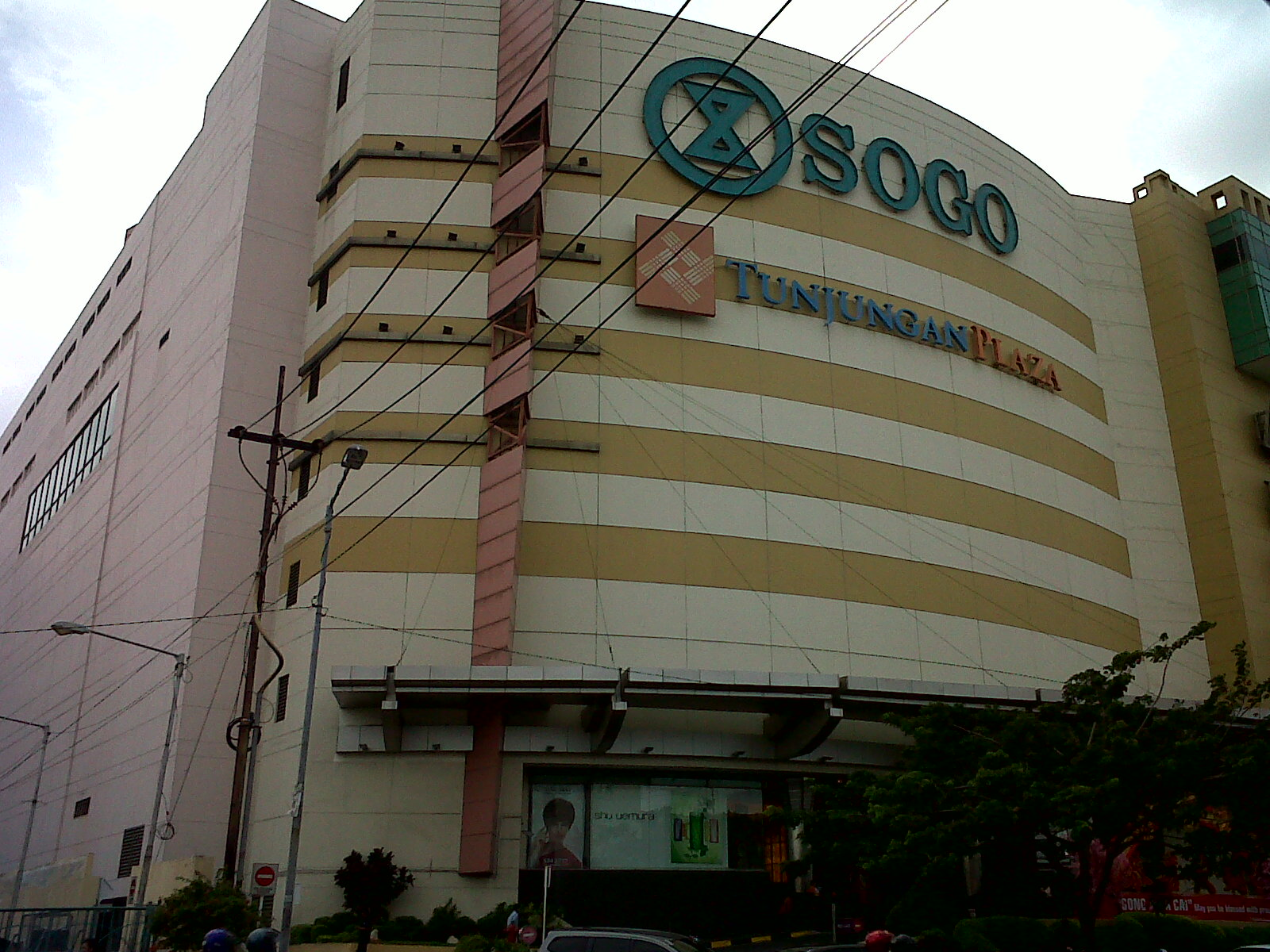
SOGO Tunjungan Plaza, Surabaya, Indonesia

== See also ==
- Seibu Department Stores, another subsidiary of Millennium Retailing
- Seven & I Holdings Co., Ltd.
