= Marvell City =

Marvell City Surabaya
- Location: Wonokromo, Surabaya, Indonesia
- Coordinates: 7.288808°S 112.745584°E
- Address: Jalan Ngagel 123, Ngagel, Wonokromo, Surabaya 60246
- Opened: 4 December 2015
- Architect: Ong & Ong Architects
- Website: marvellcity.com

Marvell City is a superblock shopping mall in Surabaya, Indonesia. The mall opened at 4 December 2015, The shopping center consists of 5 floors with tenants who are already well-known as large companies both national and international scale including Lotte Mart, CGV, Electronic Solutions, Fun World, J.CO Donuts, Pandora Escape Game, Tous Les Jours and many more. Marvell City is famous in Surabaya as family oriented mall.

== History ==
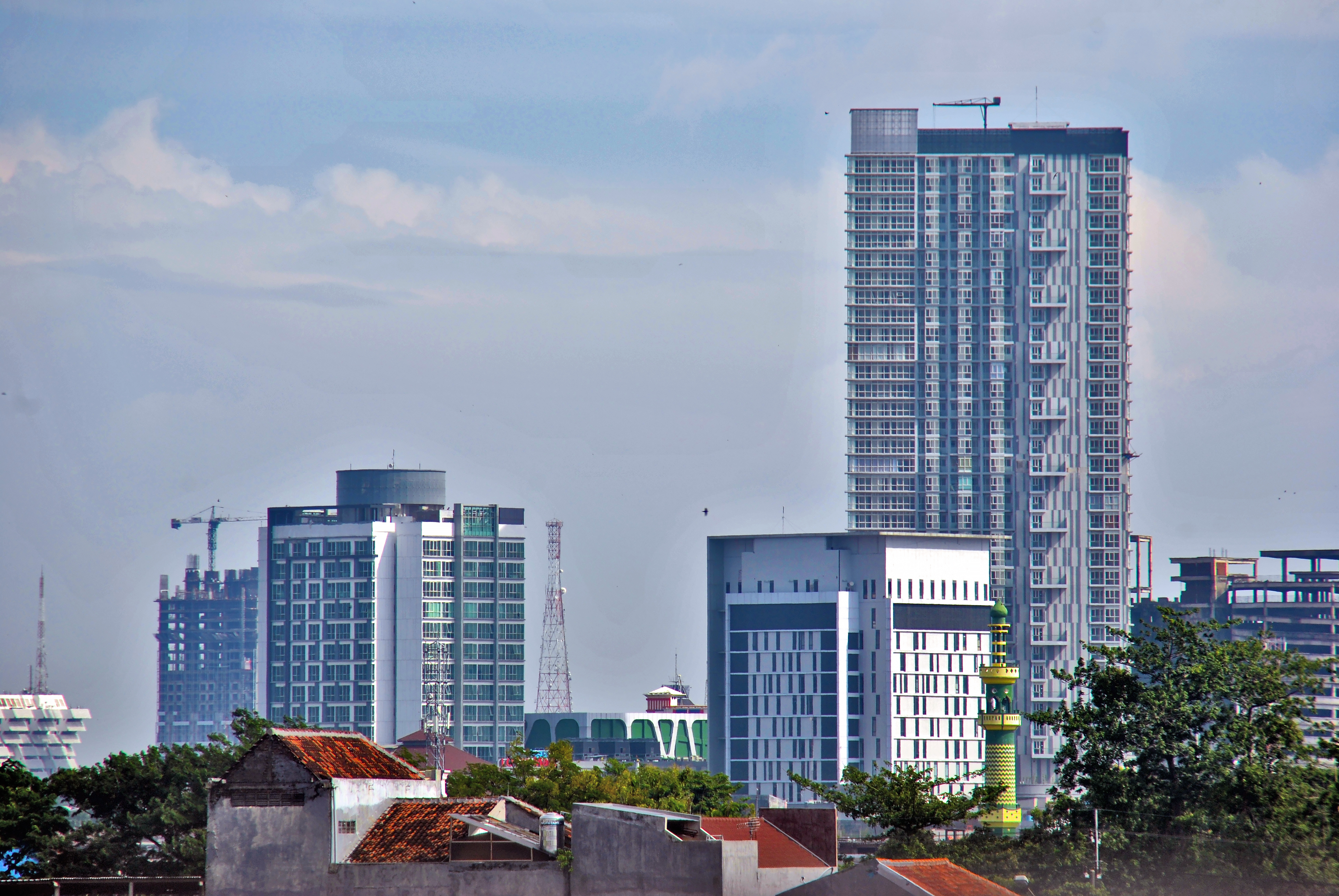
Marvell City Superblock

The building is located close to the BAT bridge has actually entered the development process around 1980s-1990s with the name Adistana, in which there are apartments and a number of other facilities. In the initial concept the apartment building used red cladding, which was quite popular for an apartment at the time. But in the 1990s, this apartment building was then left stalled for years.

In 2004, a foreign developer bought an Adistana apartment and began to continue building this apartment. In addition, the foreign company added a new building called E-Square, which is planned to become the largest shopping center in Surabaya. The existing Adistana Apartments also become part of E-Square, where between Adistana and Mall E-Square is connected via a bridge. But after that it was left stalled again for years. As a result, the main tenant of E-Square, Carrefour, entered the Central Point mall, which is not far from E-Square.

In 2012, the superblock was rebuilt again under the name Marvell City while still using the old Adistana building, but the two buildings were still left on 15 floors as in the last condition before stopping. In addition, there is also the addition of one new 36-storey tower. While the E-Square mall, which is located north of this complex, is not continued. In 2015, this superblock was completed and on December 4 of the same year, the superblock was officially opened with the main tenants of Lotte Mart and also CGV, which became the first franchise CGV movie theater in Surabaya.

== See also ==
- List of shopping malls in Indonesia
