= Jiuguang =

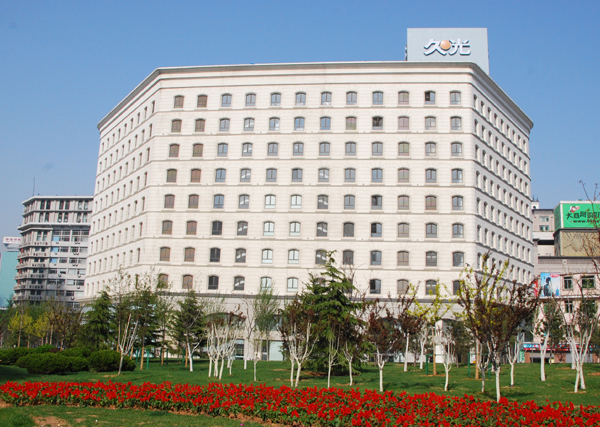
Jiuguang Department Store in Dalian, China.

Jiuguang (Chinese: 久光百货) is a Chinese department store chain, a joint venture between Chongguang Department Store and Jiubai Group (Chinese: 九百集团) of Shanghai.

Chongguang Department Store is operated by the Lifestyle International Group (Chinese: 利福國際集團), which continues Sogo's operations in Hong Kong after Sogo's bankruptcy.

Jiuguang opened its flagship store in Shanghai's Jing'an District in 2004, and branch stores in Suzhou Industrial Park in 2008 and in Dalian in 2009.
