= Ambarrukmo Plaza =

Coordinates: 7.7819°S 110.4011°E

Plaza Ambarrukmo
- Plaza Ambarrukmo
- Location: Sleman, Special Region of Yogyakarta, Indonesia
- Address: Jl. Laksda Adisucipto 55281, Yogyakarta
- Developer: PT Putera Mataram Mitra Sejahtera (Hamengkubuwono X)
- Manager: PT Putera Mataram Mitra Sejahtera
- Owner: House of Hamengkubuwono
- Floor area: 1 hectare (2.5 acres)
- Floors: 7 plus roof and basement
- Parking: 1000 cars and 1400 motorcycles
- Public transit: Trans Jogja: 1B, 4A, 5A (Jl. Solo-Ambarrukmo); 1A, 4A, 5B (Jl. Solo-Jogja Bisnis)
- Website: Plaza Ambarrukmo

Plaza Ambarrukmo (also Ambarrukmo Plaza, Amplaz) is a shopping mall in Sleman, Special Region of Yogyakarta with a building area of 120,000 m^{2} (1,300,000 sq ft). Located in Jalan Laksda Adisucipto Yogyakarta and first opened in 2006, Plaza Ambarrukmo consists of 7 (seven) floors divided into a shopping area with more than 230 tenants and a parking area that can accommodate 1,000 cars and 1,400 motorcycles. Plaza Ambarrukmo is built with a blend of classical Javanese architectural concepts and modern interior design. Plaza Ambarrukmo has several exhibition venues on the Lower Ground floor, Ground Floor, 2nd Floor, and 3rd Floor. Plaza Ambarrukmo is also supported by 24 hour security system and CCTV located inside and outside the building.

== See also ==
- List of shopping malls in Indonesia
