= Grand Tarakan Mall =

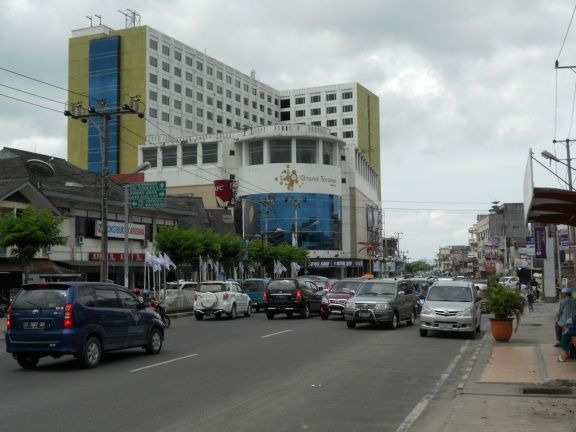
- The mall (captured in 2014)
- Location: North Kalimantan, Indonesia
- Address: Yos Sudarso Road, No.1, Karang Rejo, West Tarakan, Tarakan 77112
- Opened: 2005; 21 years ago
- Manager: PT Gusher Tarakan
- Owner: Tarakan city government
- Floors: 5

Grand Tarakan Mall is a mall at Tarakan, North Kalimantan, Indonesia. In 2010, the Jakarta Post called it "one of the biggest shopping centers in the city—and it is also the biggest in the entire region of Kalimantan."

The Mall is a central location where student congregate, and demonstrations sometimes take place.

== History ==
Grand Tarakan Mall was inaugurated in 2005. This mall is owned by Tarakan city government and operated by PT Gusher Tarakan through a build–operate–transfer contract signed in 2001. This contract runs for 30 years, so that the mall will operate until at least 2031. In January 2023, PT Gusher Tarakan was declared bankrupt by Surabaya District Court. However, this decision was disputed by one of its attorneys, Benhard Manurung, due to alleged falsification of documents by curator Fahrul Siregar and its attorney Abi Manyu. At the moment, both of them were reported to Surabaya resort police.

Grand Tarakan Mall occupies a 11-storey building, 5 of them used for the mall, while the remainder was an abandoned Novotel project. After being managed to succeed during its early years, this mall began to lose tenants since 2010s, to the point that it was once titled as the "quietest mall in the world". Currently, most tenants can only be found at Floor G, with the addition of Cinema XXI at Floor 4 and inaugurated on 23 December 2022. Grand Tarakan Mall XXI consists of 4 theatres with the capacity of 494 chairs, making it the only cinema in North Kalimantan.
