= Galaxy Mall =

Shopping center in Surabaya, Indonesia

Coordinates: 7.2748136°S 112.7819927°E

- Location: Surabaya, Indonesia
- Address: Jalan Dharmahusada Indah Timur 35–37, Surabaya
- Opened: 1996 (Galaxy Mall 1); 2006 (Galaxy Mall 2); 2019 (Galaxy Mall 3)
- Developer: PT. Sinar Galaxy
- Owner: PT. Sinar Galaxy
- Floors: 8 floors + 2 underground floors

Galaxy Mall is an eight-floor shopping center located in Surabaya, Indonesia. The mall was founded in January 1996.

== History ==
Galaxy Mall 1 (formerly called Mal Galaxy) was built in 1994. One year later, the construction was completed and the mall opened in January 1996. At the time, the shopping center was managed by PT. Sinar Galaxy. The main tenants at that time were Hero Supermarket, Timezone, Keris Department Store, McDonald's and Galaxy 21.

In 2006, Galaxy Mall opened an expansion called Galaxy Mall 2, housing tenants Sogo Department Store and Celebrity Fitness. In the same year, Hero Supermarket at Galaxy Mall 1 was replaced by an international supermarket, 99 Ranch Market. In 2010, the shopping center was renamed to Galaxy Mall and the Galaxy 21 cinema was rebranded as Galaxy XXI. In 2011, the first and only Centro Department Store in Surabaya was opened at Galaxy Mall 1. In 2013, Pull&Bear and Stradivarius opened their first outlets in Surabaya at Galaxy Mall 2. In the same year, McDonald's at Galaxy Mall 1, 2nd floor was closed and replaced by Erafone Megastore.

Construction of Galaxy Mall 3 began in 2016. On July 10, 2018, an elevated bridge was installed connecting Galaxy Mall 1 and 2 with Galaxy Mall 3. This bridge also functions as a crossing bridge for people equipped with their own elevators, and will also be integrated with the monorail implemented by the city government of Surabaya. On April 19, 2019, Galaxy Mall 3 was completed and opened with H&M, Uniqlo and Burger King as main tenants. On March 31, 2022, furniture and electronic store Informa opened at Galaxy Mall 1, replacing the now-defunct Centro Department Store. On September 3, 2022, KKV, a retail store from China, opened its 9th store and first with two floors in Indonesia, at Galaxy Mall 3.

=== Controversy ===
After construction was finished on Galaxy Mall 3 in 2019, rumors circulated that the next Galaxy Mall will also have a 4th stag, built in an area currently occupied by sports facilities owned by the National Sports Committee of Indonesia (KONI) of East Java. The current location of the KONI facility would then be moved to vacant land in Puri Galaxy housing on Jalan Arief Rahman Hakim, near the campus of the Sepuluh Nopember Institute of Technology and Hang Tuah University.
