= Tōichi =

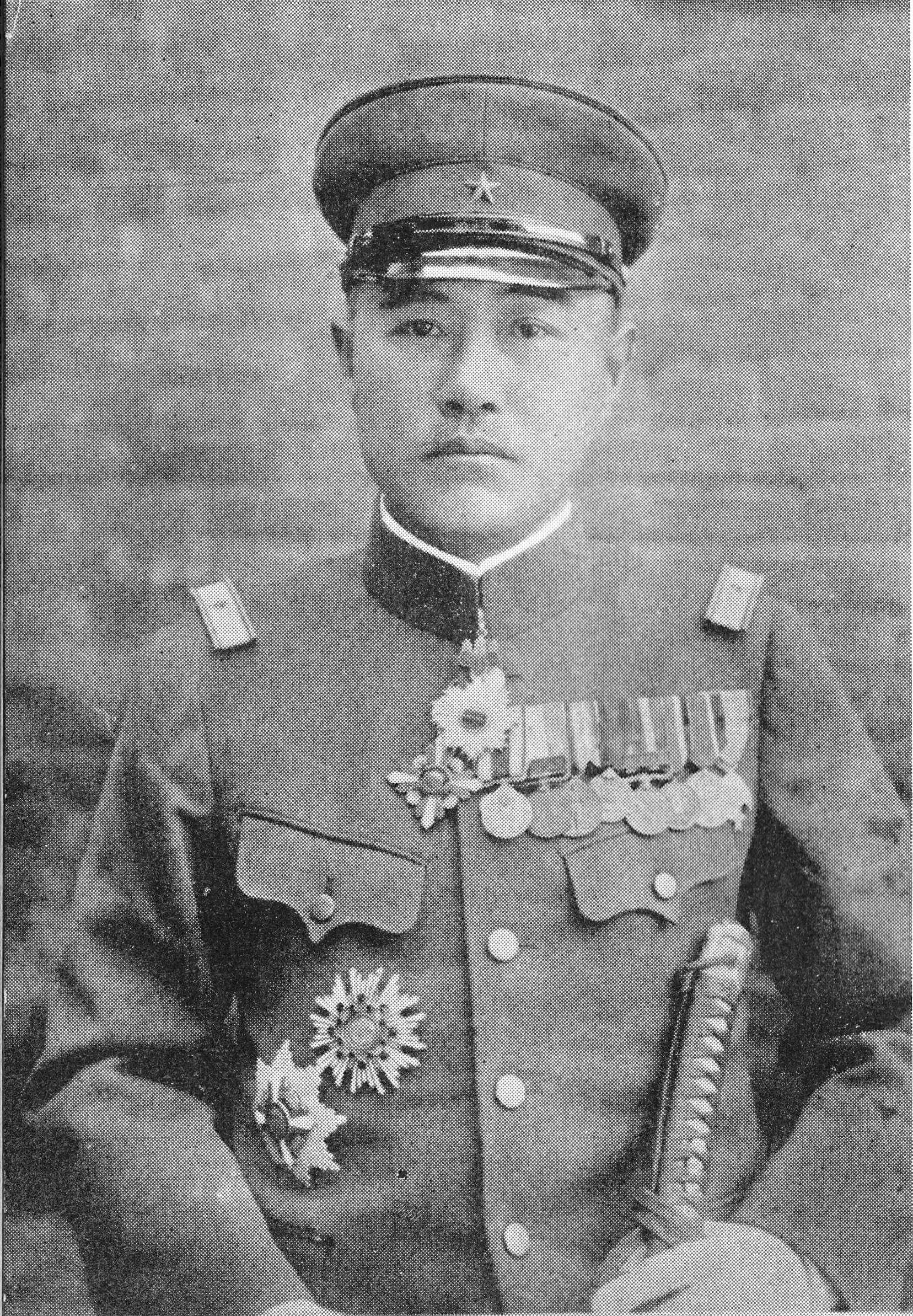
- Toichi Sasaki (1886–1955), Japanese Lieutenant
- Pronunciation: toːitɕi (IPA)
- Gender: Male

Origin
- Origin: Japanese
- Meaning: Different meanings depending on the kanji used

Other names
- Alternative spelling: Toiti (Kunrei-shiki) Toiti (Nihon-shiki) Tōichi, Toichi, Touichi (Hepburn)

Tōichi is a masculine Japanese given name.

== Written forms ==
Tōichi can be written using different combinations of kanji characters. Some examples:

- 東一, "east, one"
- 東市, "east, city"
- 唐一, "Tang (Chinese dynasty), one"
- 唐市, "Tang (Chinese dynasty), city"
- 藤一, "wisteria, one"
- 藤市, "wisteria, city"
- 棟一, "ridgepole, one"
- 登一, "ascend, one"
- 桃一, "peach tree, one"
- 稲一, "rice plant, one"
- 童一, "child, one"
- 到一, "arrive, one"

The name can also be written in hiragana とういち or katakana トウイチ.

== Notable people with the name ==
- Tōichi Katō (加藤 東一; 1916–1996), Japanese painter
- Toichi Yamaguchi (山口 東一; born 1941), Japanese middle-distance runner
- Toichi Sasaki (佐々木 到一; 1886–1955), Japanese Lieutenant

== Fictional characters ==
- Toichi Kuroba (黒羽 盗一), a character in the manga series Magic Kaito
