= 1 SGM =

1 SGM sog
- Town
- Location in Rajasthan, India 1 SGM (India)
- Coordinates: 29°22′43″N 73°51′37″E
- Country: India
- State: Rajasthan
- District: Ganganagar

Population (2001)
  - Total: 2,493

Languages
  - Official: Hindi
- Time zone: UTC+5:30 (IST)
- ISO 3166 code: IN-RJ
- Website: www.ganganagar.nic.in

1 SGM is a census town in Ganganagar district in the state of Rajasthan, India.

== Demographics ==
As of 2001 India census, 1 SGM had a population of 2493. Males constitute 53% of the population and females 47%. 1 SGM has an average literacy rate of 43%, lower than the national average of 59.5%; with 64% of the males and 36% of females literate. 19% of the population is under 6 years of age.
