= Samarinda Central Plaza =

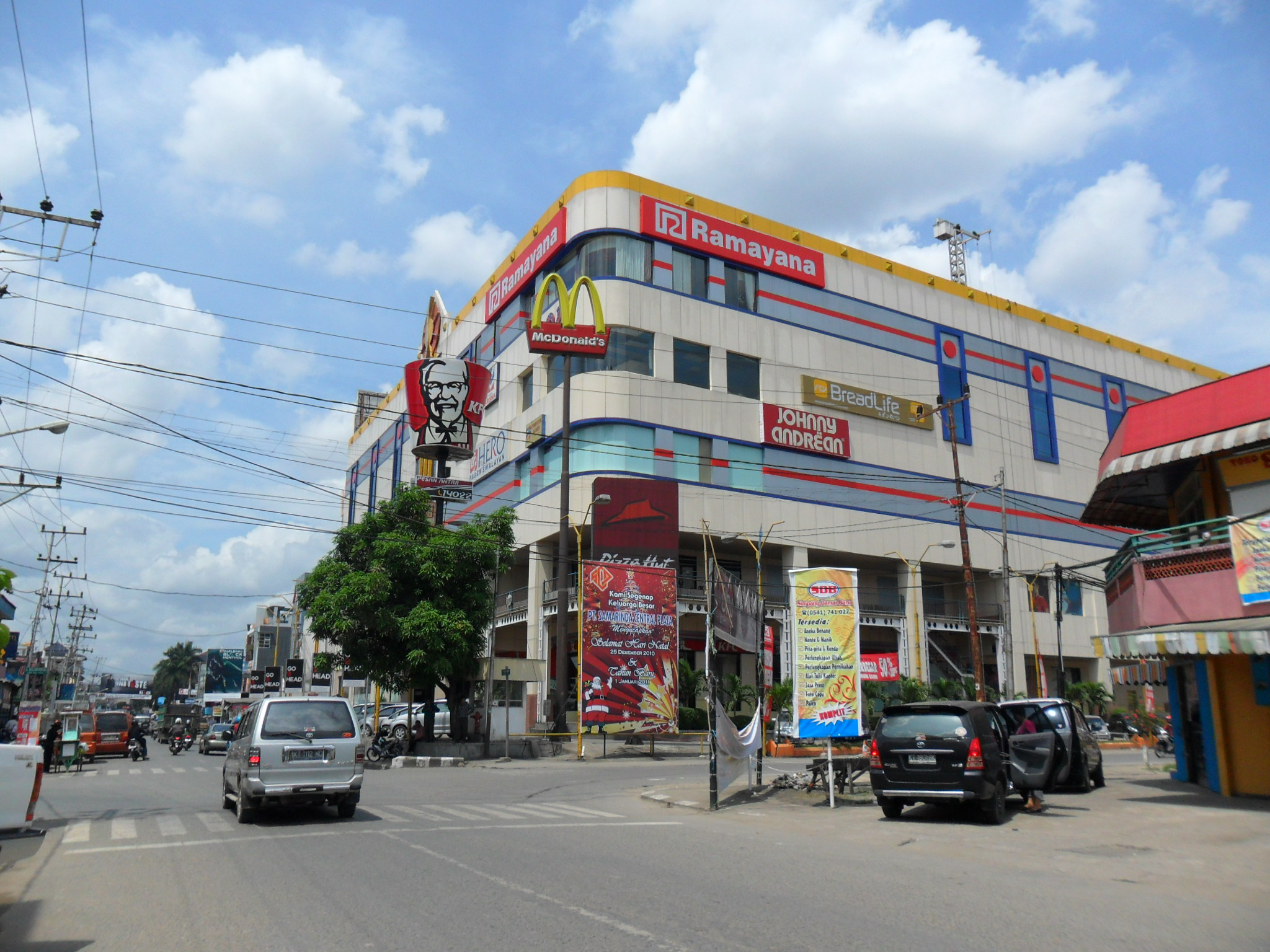
- The building (as of 2010)
- Location: East Kalimantan, Indonesia
- Coordinates: 0.50353°S 117.15492°E
- Address: Pulau Irian Road No. 1, Pelabuhan, Samarinda Kota, Samarinda 75112
- Opened: 2001; 25 years ago
- Owner: PT Samarinda Central Plaza
- Floors: 5
- Website: www.scpsamarinda.id

Samarinda Central Plaza, usually abbreviated as SCP, is a shopping mall in Samarinda, East Kalimantan. Founded in 2001, this mall has been under ownership by PT Samarinda Central Plaza, a company founded by Rusianto (now deceased) and currently led by his daughter, Helen Rusianto. SCP is one of the oldest malls in Samarinda.

== History ==
Samarinda Central Plaza was founded by Rusianto (Ong To Tji), a businessman that was previously known as the founder of PT Perusahaan Pelayaran Rusianto Bersaudara, a shipping company with the focus on energy and coal freight. When it was first opened, SCP became the largest mall in Samarinda and received prestige after becoming the first mall with a cinema facility within the city. On 19 February 2011, SCP suffered a fire from Floor 2 for unclear reasons, causing visitors to escape themselves.

SCP consists of 5 floors. The oldest tenant is Ramayana Lestari Sentosa on Floors 1 dan 2; they still operate since it was first opened on 9 November 2001. Previously, SCP was one of few places in Indonesia with 2 different cinema chains owned by 21 Cineplex: SCP 21 and SCP XXI. Both cinemas are located on Floor 3, but SCP 21 had been existed since its opening, while SCP XXI was only opened on 9 March 2012. SCP 21 provided 4 regular theaters with the capacity of 722 chairs, while SCP XXI provides 5 regular theaters and 1 VIP theater The Premiere, with the capacity of 922 chairs. On 30 June 2023, SCP 21 was officially closed. Alongside the previously mentioned two tenants, Hero (supermarket) once occupied the Floor G. Previously replaced by Giant, their land has been now occupied by Farmers Market since 16 November 2017.

On 25 January 2014, Kawan Lama Sejahtera opened the second branch in Samarinda for Azko (previously Ace Hardware) at SCP. That furniture shop is located at Floors UG and 1.
