= Singkawang Grand Mall =

- Location: Singkawang, West Kalimantan, Indonesia
- Coordinates: 0.89914°N 108.96964°E
- Address: Jalan Tani
- Opened: 11 February 2017
- Floors: 5
- Parking: P1-P7
- Website: singkawanggrandmall.com

Singkawang Grand Mall (abbreviated as SGM) is a shopping mall in Singkawang, West Kalimantan, Indonesia. This mall was officially opened in 2015 and since that time become the largest shopping mall in West Kalimantan. The building has twelve floors, with the lowest five floors allocated for shopping mall and the rest are for hotel. The mall have anchor tenants such as Matahari and Hypermart.
