= Surabaya =

Capital and largest city of East Java, Indonesia

- City
- City of Surabaya; Kota Surabaya

Regional transcription(s)
  - Javanese: Kuthå Suråbåyå (Gêdrig) كوڟا سورابايا (Pégon) ꦏꦸꦛꦯꦸꦫꦨꦪ (Hånåcåråkå)
  - Madurese: Kottha Sorbhâjâ (Latèn) كَوڟّا سَوربۤاجۤا (Pèghu) ꦏꦺꦴꦛ꧀ꦛꦯꦺꦴꦂꦧꦗ (Carakan)
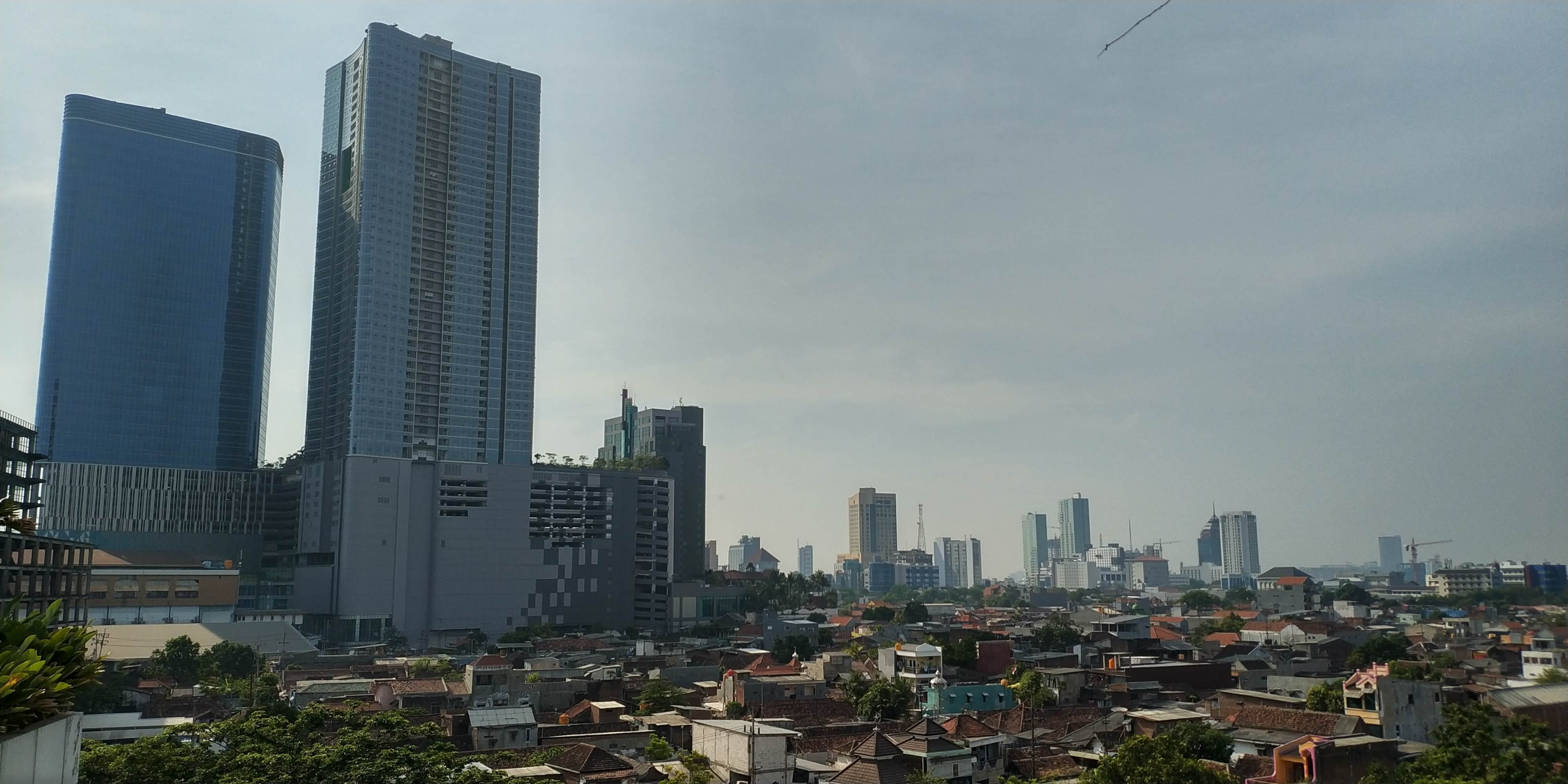
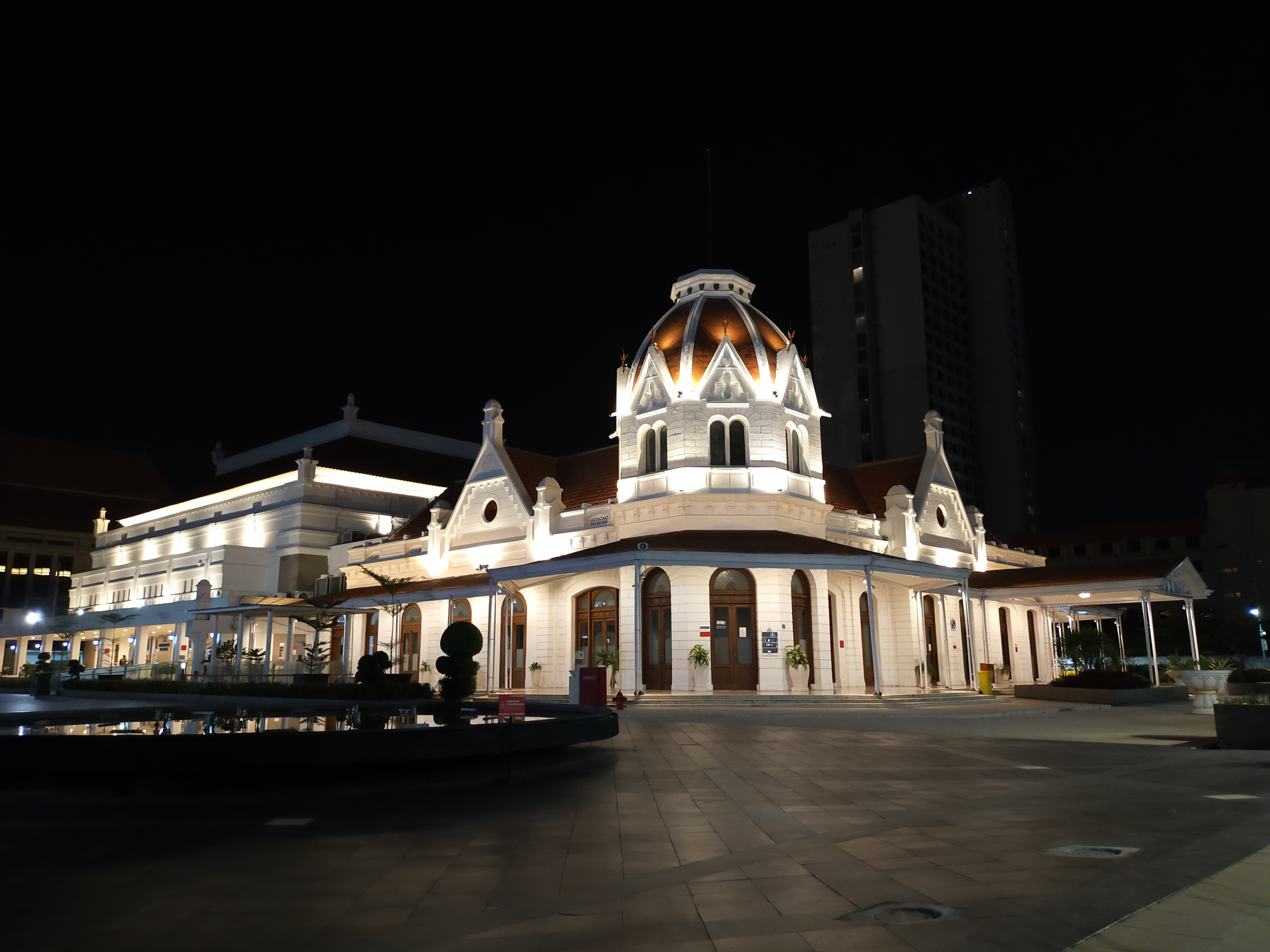
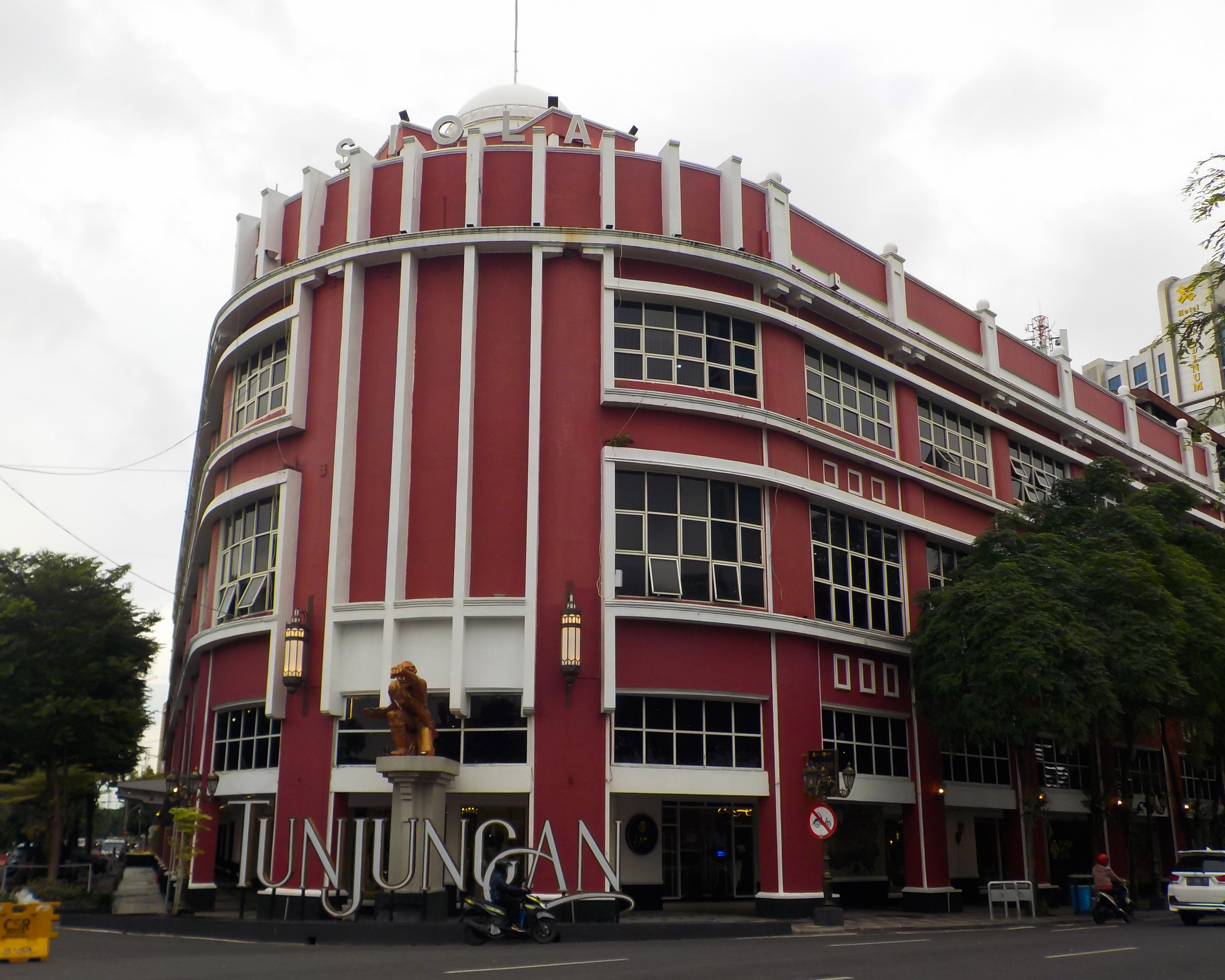
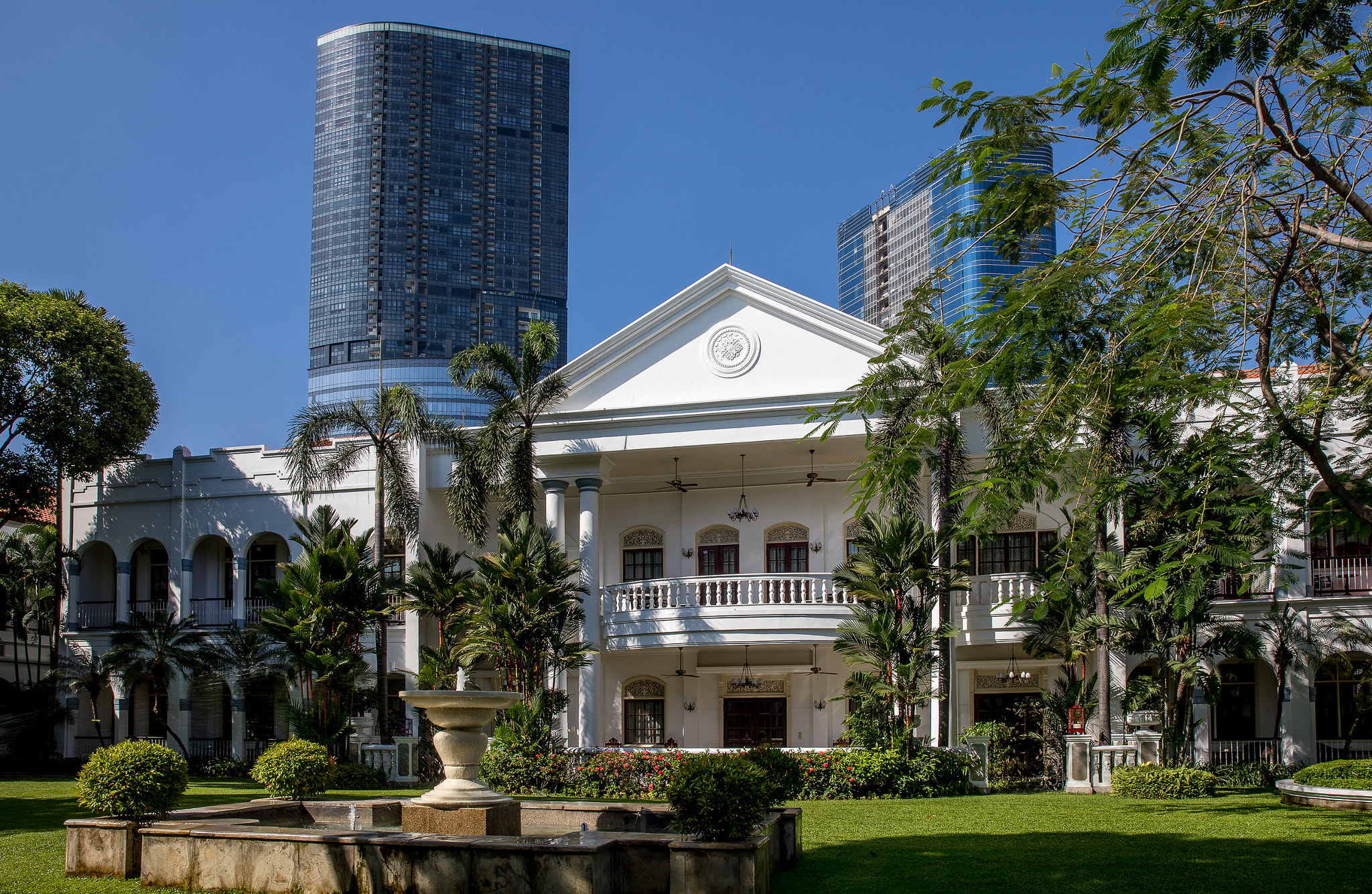
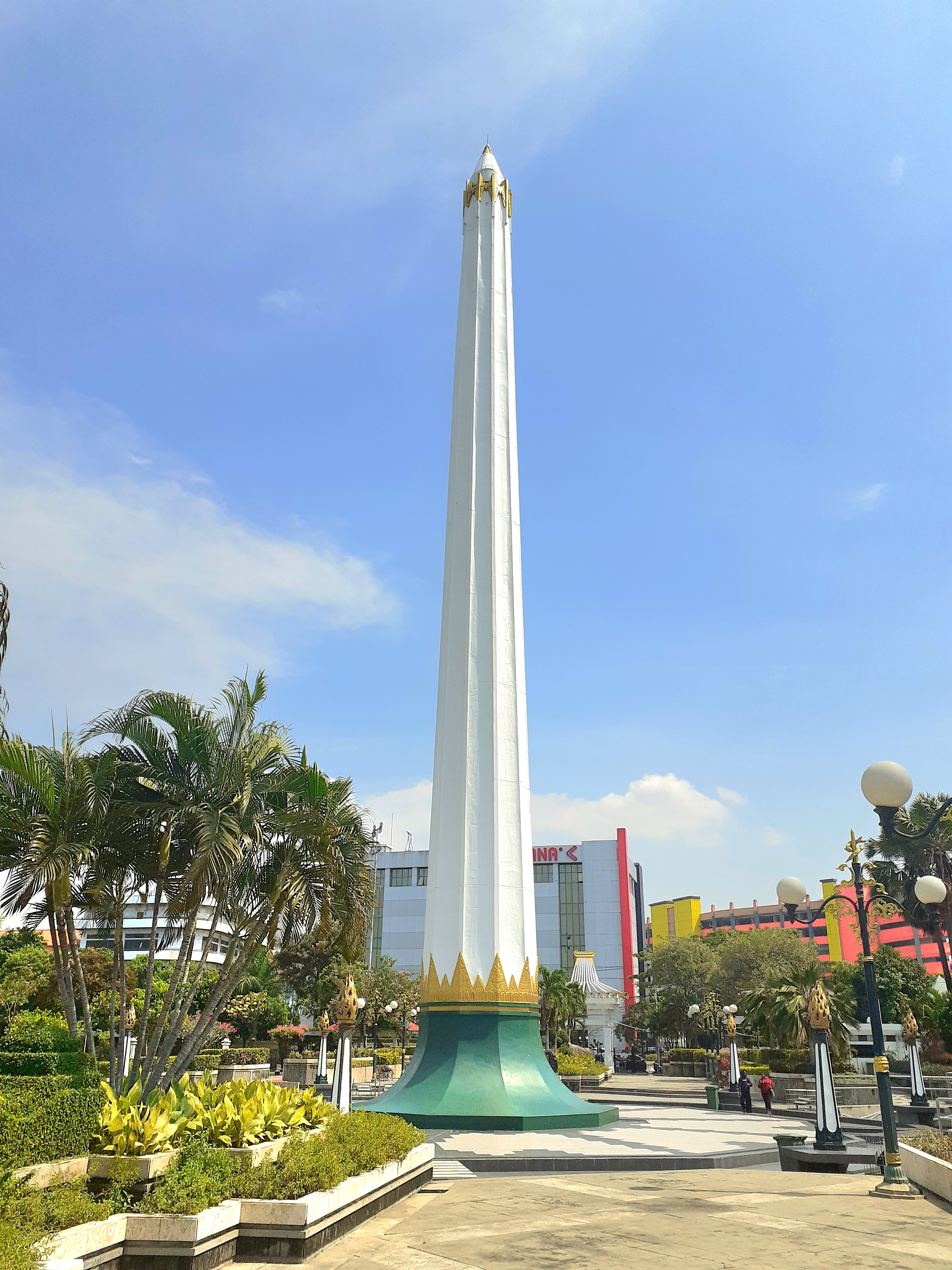
- Downtown Surabaya skyline Balai Pemuda Tunjungan Street Hotel Majapahit Heroes Monument

- Flag Coat of arms
- Nicknames: Kota Pahlawan "City of Heroes"
- Motto: Sura ing Baya (Old Javanese) "Daring to face Danger"
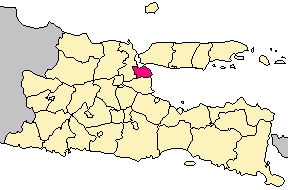
- Location within East Java

- Location in Java and Indonesia Surabaya (Indonesia)
- Coordinates: 07°14′45″S 112°44′16″E
- Country: Indonesia
- Province: East Java
- Metropolitan area: Gerbangkertosusila
- Founded: 1037
- Settled: 31 May 1293
- Incorporated: 1 April 1906 (as Gemeente)

Government
  - Type: Mayor–council
  - Body: Surabaya City Government
  - Mayor: Eri Cahyadi (PDI-P)
  - Vice Mayor: Armuji
  - Legislature: Surabaya City Regional House of Representatives (DPRD)

Area
  - City: 334.50 km^{2} (129.15 sq mi)
  - Metro: 6,309.34 km^{2} (2,436.05 sq mi)
- Elevation: 5 m (16 ft)

Population (mid 2025 estimate)
  - City: 3,003,860
  - Rank: 2nd
  - Density: 8,583.47/km^{2} (22,231.1/sq mi)
  - Metro: 10,081,343
  - Metro density: 1,615/km^{2} (4,180/sq mi)
- Demonyms: Surabayan

Nominal GDP (nominal, 2023)
  - Total: Rp 715.294 trillion US$ 46.928 billion
  - Per capita: Rp 245.685 million US$ 16,118
- Time zone: UTC+07:00 (Indonesia Western Standard Time)
- Postal Code: 60111 – 60299
- Area code: (+62) 31
- Vehicle registration: L
- HDI (2024): ▲0.841 (10th) very high
- Website: www.surabaya.go.id

Surabaya (Note: English: /ˌsʊərəˈbaɪə/ SOOR-ə-BY-ə, Indonesian: [suraˈbaja], Javanese: [surɔˈbɔjɔ]; Van Ophuijsen Spelling: Soerabaja.) is the capital and largest city of East Java province and the second-largest city in Indonesia, after Jakarta. Located on the northeastern corner of Java island, on the Madura Strait, it is one of the earliest port cities in Southeast Asia. According to the National Development Planning Agency, Surabaya is one of the four main central cities of Indonesia, alongside Jakarta, Medan, and Makassar. The city covers a land area of 334.50 km^{2}, and had a population of 2,874,314 within its city limits at the 2020 census. With 3,003,860 people living in the city as of mid 2025 (comprising 1,487,077 males and 1,516,783 females) and over 10 million in the extended Surabaya metropolitan area, according to the latest official estimate, Surabaya is the second-largest metropolitan area in Indonesia. Surabaya metropolitan area also has ASEAN's 6th largest economy, ahead of Hanoi. In 2023, the city's GRP PPP was estimated at US$150.294 billion.

The city was settled in the 10th century by the Kingdom of Janggala, one of the two Javanese kingdoms that was formed in 1045 when Airlangga abdicated his throne in favor of his two sons (the other was the Kediri kingdom). In the late 15th and 16th centuries, Surabaya grew to be a duchy, a major political and military power as well as a port in eastern Java, probably under the Majapahit empire. At that time, Surabaya was already a major trading port, owing to its location on the River Brantas delta and the trade route between Malacca and the Spice Islands via the Java Sea. During the decline of Majapahit, the lord of Surabaya resisted the rise of the Demak Sultanate and only submitted to its rule in 1530. Surabaya became independent after the death of Sultan Trenggana of Demak in 1546.

From the 18th century until the mid-20th century, Surabaya was the largest city in the Dutch East Indies and the main trading hub for the Indonesian archipelago, competing with Shanghai and Hong Kong.

Surabaya has been one of the busiest trading city ports in Asia. Principal exports from the port include sugar, tobacco, and coffee. Its rich history as a trading port has led to a strong financial infrastructure with financial institutions such as banks, insurance, and export-import companies. The economy is influenced by the recent growth in international industries and the completion of the Suramadu Bridge. The city is home to a large shipyard and numerous specialized naval schools. The Bank of Indonesia has also made plans for Surabaya to be the Islamic financial center of Indonesia. Surabaya is classified as a Gamma− (Gamma minus) global city according to the World Cities 2024 - GaWC rankings by the Globalization and World Cities Research Network.

== Name ==
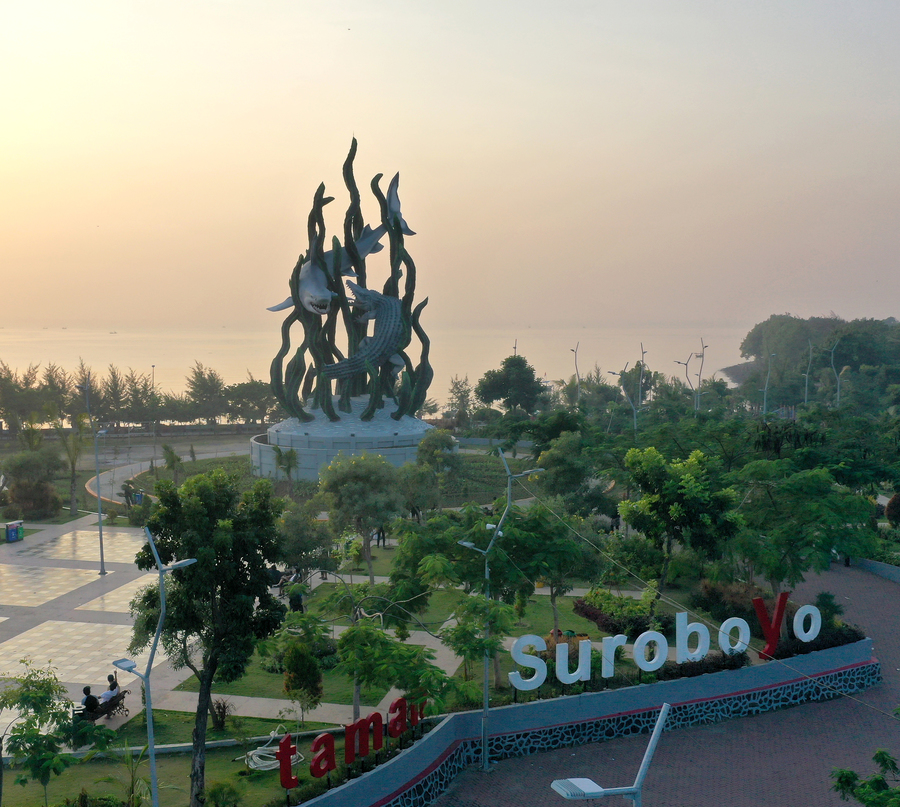
Sura and Baya Statue

The name Surabaya, derived from the Javanese phrase "sura ing baya," translates to "bravely facing danger." Its origins trace back to the Pali words "sura," referring to the figure "Asura" from Buddhist beliefs, and bhaya, meaning "fear," "perils," or "danger." This name is connected to a prophecy by Jayabaya, a 12th-century psychic king of the Kediri kingdom, whose name itself means "conquering fear or perils, drawn from the Pali words "jaya" or "vijaya" (victory or conqueror) and bhaya (fear or peril). Jayabaya predicted a battle between a giant white shark and a giant white crocodile in the region.

The event is sometimes interpreted as foretelling the Mongol invasion of Java, a major conflict between the forces of Kublai Khan, Mongol ruler of China, and those of Raden Wijaya's Majapahit on 31 May 1293, which is now considered the date of the city's founding.

The two animals are now used as the city's symbol, with the two facing and circling each other, as depicted in a statue appropriately located near the entrance to the city zoo.

Some people consider Jayabaya's prophecy as being about the great war between native Surabayan people and foreign invaders at the start of the war of independence in 1945. Another story tells of two heroes who fought each other to be the king of the city. The two heroes were named Sura and Baya. These folk etymologies, though embraced enthusiastically by its people and city leaders, are unverifiable.

Surabaya was previously known as Soerabaja, a name written using the van Ophuijsen spelling system, an older form of Indonesian orthography.

== History ==
=== Early history ===
The Kingdom of Janggala was one of the two Javanese kingdoms that were formed in 1045 when Airlangga abdicated the throne of the Kingdom of Kahuripan in favor of his two sons. The earliest historical record of Surabaya was in the 1225 book Zhu Fan Zhi written by Zhao Rukuo, in which it was called Zhòng Jiā Lú (重迦庐). The name Janggala is derived from the Old Javanese name Hujung Galuh (lit. 'Cape Diamond' or 'Cape Gemstone'). Hujung Galuh was located on the estuary of Brantas River and today is part of modern Surabaya city and Sidoarjo Regency.

By the 14th and 15th centuries, Surabaya was one of the Majapahit ports or coastal settlements, together with Tuban, Gresik, and Hujung Galuh (modern Sidoarjo). Ma Huan documented the early 15th-century visit of Zheng He's treasure ships in his 1433 book Yingya Shenglan.

After travelling south for more than 20 li, the ship reached Sulumayi, whose foreign name is Surabaya. At the estuary, the outflowing water is fresh.

— Ma Huan, Yingya Shenglan

Ma Huan visited Java during Zheng He's fourth expedition in 1413, coinciding with the reign of Majapahit king Wikramawardhana. He describes his travel to the Majapahit capital. He first arrived at the port of Tupan (Tuban) where he saw large numbers of Chinese settlers migrated from Guangdong and Zhangzhou. Then, he sailed east to the thriving new trading town of Koerhhsi (Gresik), Supaerhya (Surabaya), and then sailing inland into the river by smaller boat to the southwest until he reached the Brantas river port of Changku (Canggu). Continuing to travel by land to the southwest, he arrived in ManchepoI (Majapahit), where the Javanese king stayed.

=== Pre-colonial era ===
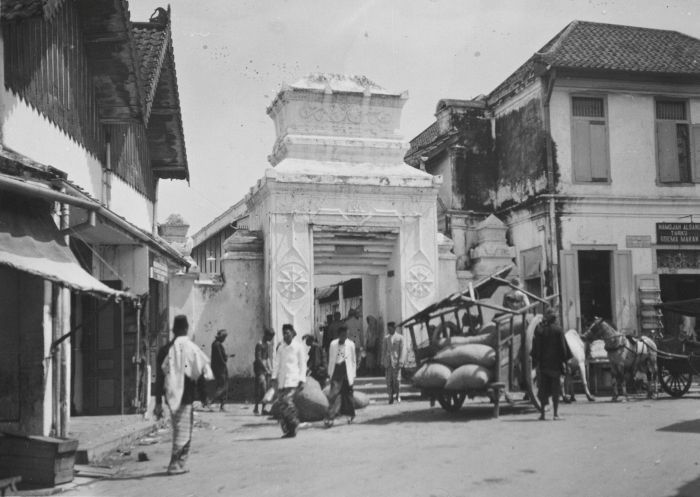
Ampel Mosque built in 1421

The Surabaya area was once the main gateway to the capital of the Majapahit Kingdom from the sea, at the mouth of Kali Mas river. The anniversary of the city of Surabaya was set on May 31, 1293, commemorating the victory of the Majapahit led by Raden Wijaya against the Mongol invasion. Mongol troops who came from the sea were described as Sura (sharks/brave) and Raden Wijaya's troops who came from the land were described as Baya (crocodiles/danger), literally translating to brave to face the dangers that come threatening. So the day of victory is commemorated as the anniversary of Surabaya.

By the late 15th century, Islam began to take its root in Surabaya. The settlement of Ampel, located around Ampel Mosque in today's Ampel village, Semampir District, northern Surabaya, was established by Islamic preacher Sunan Ampel.

In the late 15th and 16th centuries, Surabaya grew to a duchy, a major political and military power in eastern Java. The Portuguese writer Tomé Pires mentioned that a Muslim lord was in power in Surabaya in 1513, though likely still a vassal of the Hindu–Buddhist Majapahit. By that time, Surabaya was already a major trading port, owing to its location on the Brantas River delta and the trade route between Malacca and the Spice Islands via the Java Sea. During the decline of Majapahit, the lord of Surabaya resisted the rise of the Demak Sultanate and only submitted to its rule in 1530. Surabaya became independent after the death of Sultan Trenggana of Demak in 1546.

Following the collapse of Demak, Surabaya was conquered by the Mataram Sultanate, under the leadership of Panembahan Senopati in 1598, and invaded by Panembahan Seda ing Krapyak in 1610, An article by the VOC in 1620 described Surabaya as a rich and powerful region.

The Duchy of Surabaya entered conflict with and was later captured by the more powerful Sultanate of Mataram in 1625 under Sultan Agung. It was one of Mataram's fiercest campaigns, in which they had to conquer Surabaya's allies, Sukadana and Madura, and to lay siege to the city, blocking the flow of the Brantas River, Sultan Agung forced Surabaya to surrender. With this conquest, Mataram then controlled most of Java, except the Banten Sultanate and the Dutch settlement of Batavia.

=== Colonial era ===
Coat of arms of Soerabaja (old spelling of Surabaya) during Dutch colonial era, granted in 1931

The expanding Dutch East India Company took over the city from a weakened Mataram in November 1743. In consolidating its rule over Surabaya and, in time, the rest of East Java, the Dutch collaborated with leading regional magnates, including Ngabehi Soero Pernollo (1720–1776), his brother Han Bwee Kong, Kapitein der Chinezen (1727–1778), and his nephew, Han Chan Piet, Majoor der Chinezen (1759–1827), all from the powerful Han family of Lasem.

In the 18th and 19th centuries, Surabaya was largest city in the Dutch East Indies, becoming a major trading center and hosting the most extensive naval base in the colony. Surabaya also served as the center of Java's plantation economy, industry, supported by its natural harbor.

During the Dutch East Indies era, Surabaya was the capital of the Surabaya Residency, whose territory encompasses what is now the Gresik Regency, Sidoarjo, Mojokerto, and Jombang. In 1905, Surabaya received the status of municipality (gemeente). In 1926, Surabaya was designated the capital of the province of East Java. Since then Surabaya developed into the second largest city in the Dutch East Indies after Batavia.

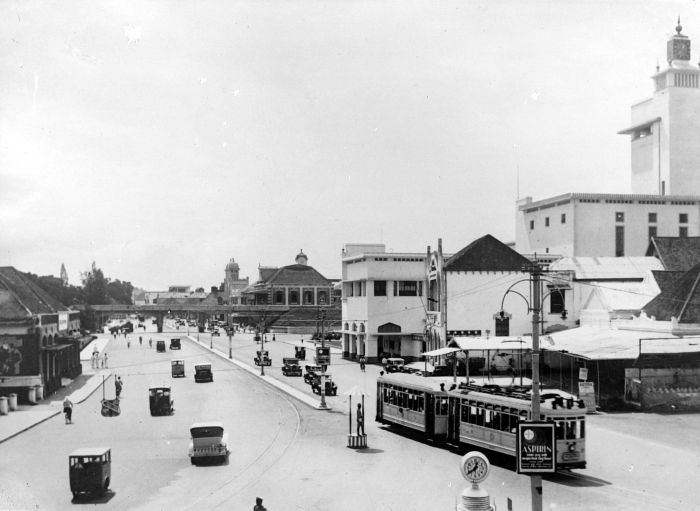
The Pasar Besar with the OJS railway viaduct in the background, the so-called Hogeweg, Surabaya circa between 1900 and 1940

Before 1900, the city center of Surabaya revolved around the Jembatan Merah (lit. 'Red Bridge'). In 1910, a modern port facility was built in Surabaya, now known as Tanjung Perak Harbor. Until the 1920s, new settlements such as Darmo, Gubeng, Rungkut, and Ketabang grew.

Surabaya was an early center for leftist political organizing in colonial Indonesia. In the 1910s, Dutch colonists founded the predecessor to the Communist Party of Indonesia (PKI), the ISDV. The success of organizing with sailors and local Indonesians led to a crackdown in 1917.

=== Independence era ===
Japan occupied the city in 1942, as part of the Japanese occupation of the Dutch East Indies, and it was bombed by the Allies in 1944. After the surrender of Japan at the end of World War II, Surabaya was seized by Indonesian nationalists. The young nation soon came into conflict with the British, who had become caretakers of the Dutch colony after the Japanese surrender.

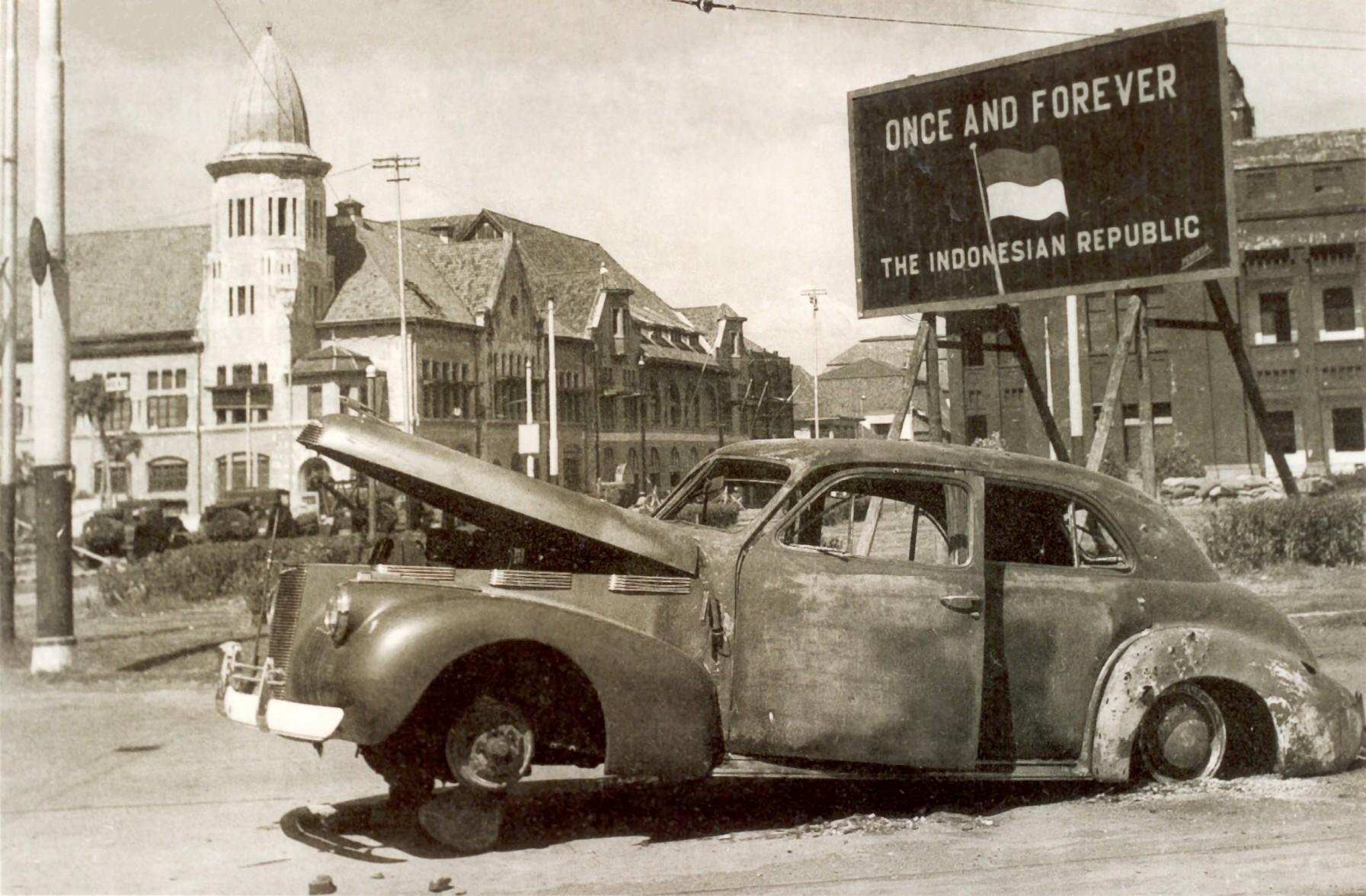
The burnt-out car of Brigadier Mallaby on the spot where he was killed by pro-independence Indonesian soldiers during the Battle of Surabaya on 31 October 1945

The Battle of Surabaya, started after the Arek-Arek Suroboyo (lit. 'Young People (or just people) of Surabaya') killed British Brigadier Aubertin Mallaby on 30 October 1945, near Jembatan Merah, allegedly with a stray bullet. The Allies gave an ultimatum to the Republicans inside the city to surrender, but they refused. The ensuing battle, which cost thousands of lives, took place on 10 November, which Indonesians subsequently celebrate as Hari Pahlawan (Heroes' Day). The incident of the red-white flag (the Dutch flag at the top of Yamato Hotel's tower that was torn into the Indonesian red-white flag) by Bung Tomo is also recorded as a heroic feat during the struggle over the city.

The city is known as Kota Pahlawan (lit. 'The City of Heroes') due to the importance of the Battle of Surabaya in galvanising Indonesian and international support for Indonesian independence during the Indonesian National Revolution.

=== Modern history ===
Recent development of Surabaya

After the independence era, population growth and rapid urbanization forced Surabaya to develop towards the east and west as it is today. The increase in vehicles, the growth of new industries and the proliferation of housing carried out by real estate companies occupying the outskirts of the city have resulted in traffic jams not only in the downtown area but also frequently in the suburbs. Surabaya grew from a relative poor city in the late 19th century into a metropolis in the late 20th century, and became one of the fastest growing metropolitan areas in Southeast Asia. Surabaya also managed to become one of the most organized metropolitan cities in Indonesia with the cleanest air.

On 13 May 2018, three churches in Surabaya and one apartment complex in the neighboring regency of Sidoarjo were bombed in a series of terrorist attacks initiated by Jamaah Ansharut Daulah, the Southeast Asian branch of ISIS, followed by a bombing on Surabaya Police Department HQ the next day. 28 people were killed, including the assailants. 57 people were injured; several of whom where in a critical condition.

The first confirmed case of COVID-19 in East Java was in Surabaya, on 17 March 2020. In May 2020, Surabaya became the epicenter of the pandemic in Indonesia.

== Geography ==
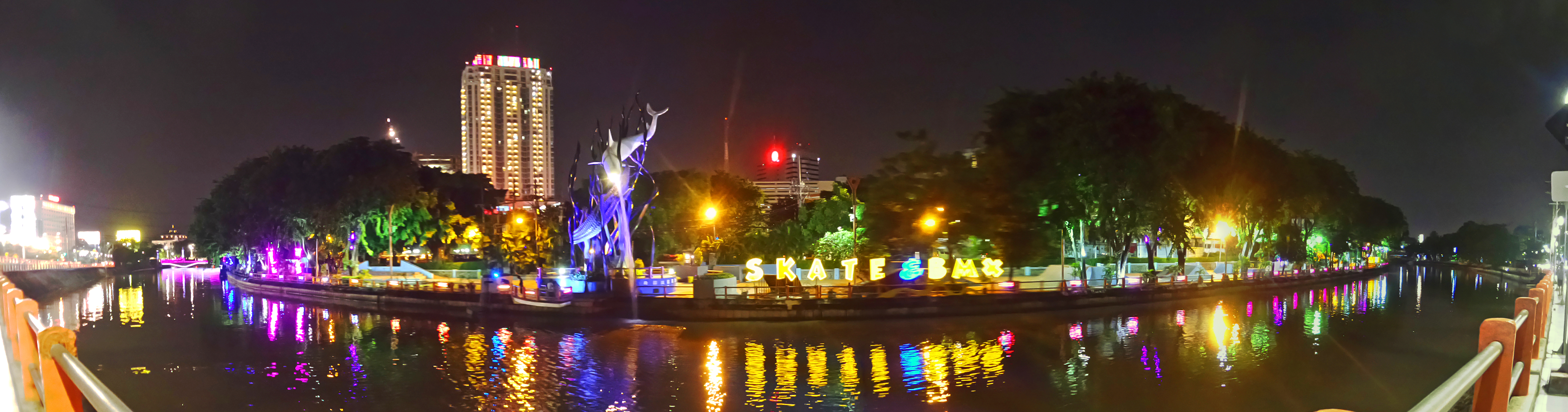
Panorama of Central Surabaya at night with Sura and Baya Statue

Surabaya, the capital of East Java province, extends over 335.93 km^{2} (129.70 sq mi), its metropolitan area covers 6,309.34 km^{2} (2,436.05 sq mi), which includes the satellite cities of Mojokerto, Gresik, Sidoarjo, Bangkalan, and Lamongan, and has an estimated population of 10.08 million as of 2024, making it the Second largest urban area in Indonesia and the Top 50 largest in the world. Surabaya ranks 11th among the Indonesian city in the human development index. Surabaya's offer business and employment opportunities, along with its ability to offer a potentially higher standard of living compared to other parts of the country, have attracted migrants from across the Indonesian archipelago, making it a melting pot of numerous cultures.

The city is referred to as Kota Pahlawan (the city of heroes) due to the significance of the Battle of Surabaya during the Indonesian National Revolution. The city is one of the important financial, commercial, industrial, transportation, and entertainment hubs of the archipelago. Arguably the second most significant city after Jakarta, the city is also home to Indonesia's second-busiest seaport, the Port of Tanjung Perak, which is located in northern Surabaya. The city is also known for being one of the cleanest and greenest in Indonesia.

=== Architecture ===
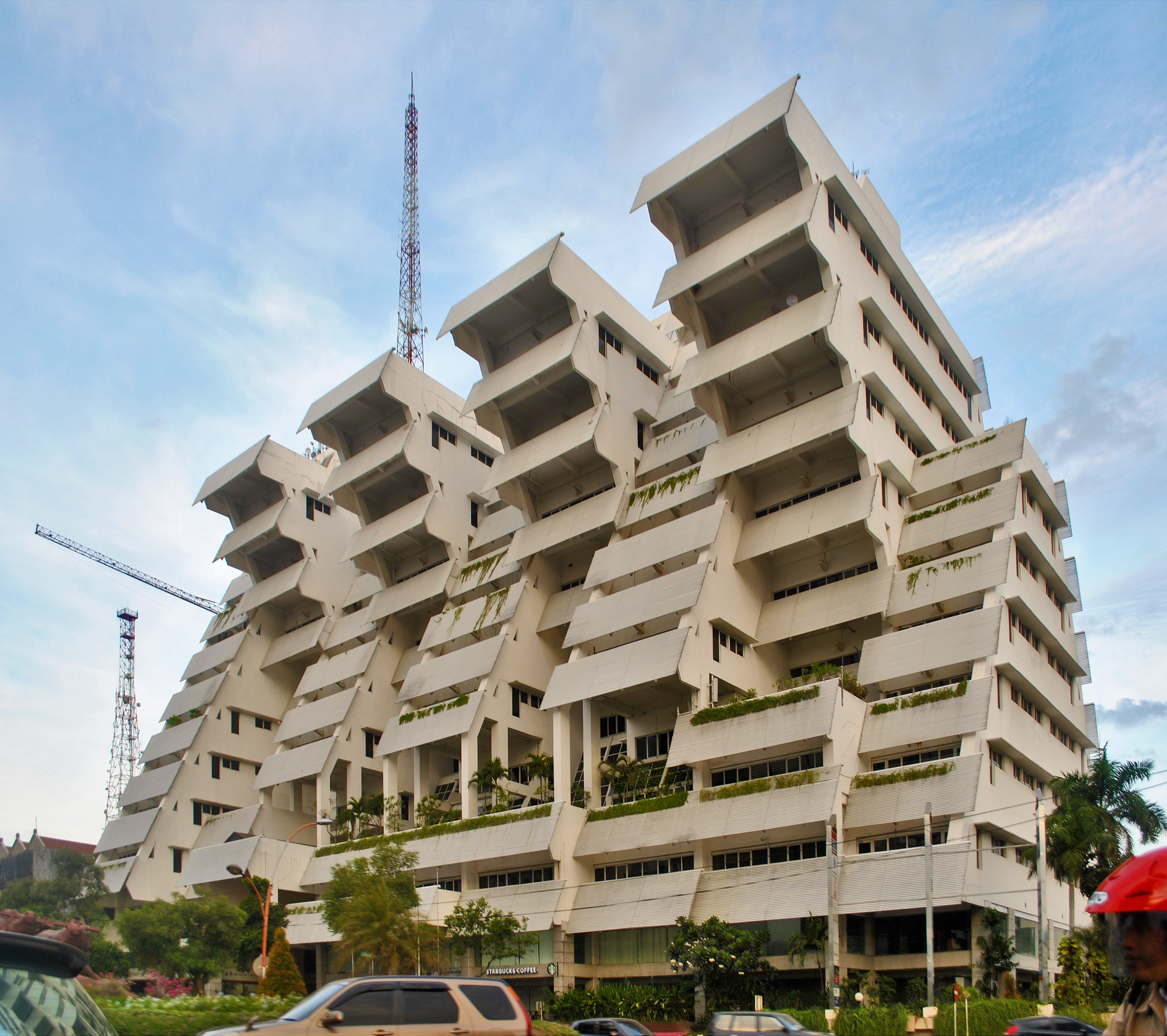
Wisma Intiland, most famous Brutalist architecture in Surabaya. It is one of the last buildings designed by Paul Rudolph.

Architecture in Surabaya is a mixture of colonial, Asian, Javanese, modern, and post-modern influences. There are many colonial-era relics still standing today, such as Hotel Majapahit and Surabaya Post Office. As a relatively old city in Indonesia and Southeast Asia, most colonial buildings were built around the 17th century to the early 20th century. These buildings show the influence of Dutch or European style in the Middle Ages.

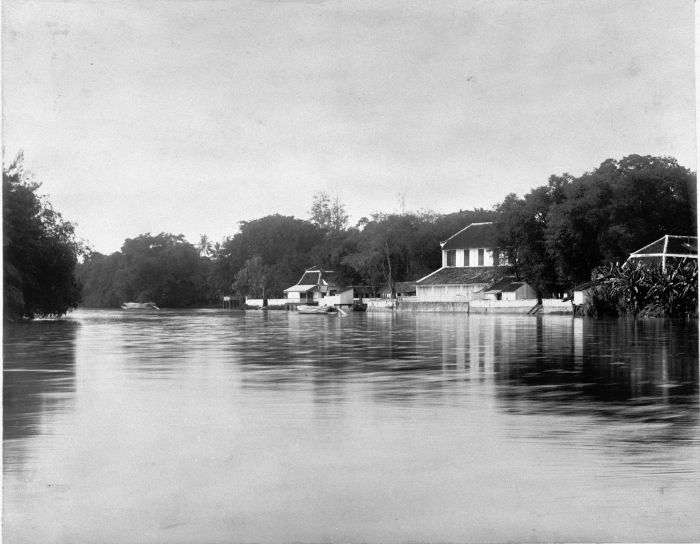
Resident's house along the Ketabang River in Surabaya (late 19th century)

Ketabang is an area of Genteng District of Surabaya which was planned by Dutch architect Cosman Citroen.

Before the Second World War, there were many shophouses in the old part of the city, mostly two-storey. They display the influence of European and Chinese traditions. Although some have been dismantled for new construction, there are still many old buildings that are preserved as cultural heritage and city icons, which are around the area of Kembang Jepun Street, Karet Street, Gula Street, Slompretan Street, and Rajawali Street.

After the independence of Indonesia, the center of Surabaya's architectural development was concentrated only in the area of Jembatan Merah and its surroundings. In the late 1990s and early 2000s, modern and post-modern style buildings were increasingly emerging in Surabaya. Along with economic development, such buildings have continued to grow. In the 2010s, Surabaya has become a center of skyscrapers and high-rises in East Java and central regions of Indonesia, such as The Peak Residence – Tunjungan Plaza 6 (215 meters) and One Icon Residence–Tunjungan Plaza 5 (200 meters).

=== Parks and Gardens ===
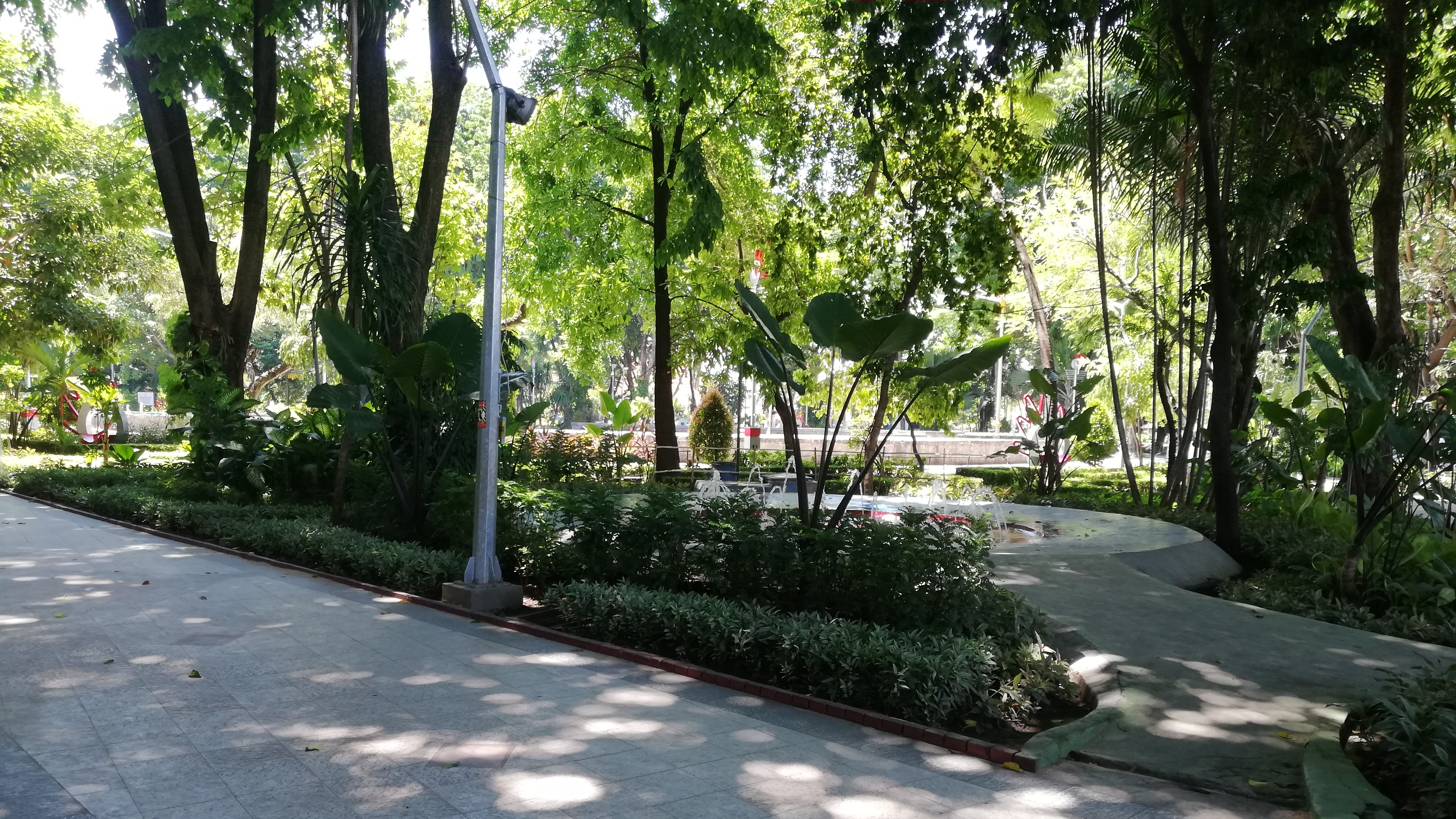
Bungkul Park, one of the most visited parks in Surabaya

Surabaya is among the cleanest and greenest cities in Indonesia. It has urban parks which are equipped with fountains in almost every neighborhood area. These parks include Bungkul Park, Harmoni Park, Pelangi Park, Surya Park, Mundu Park, Undaan Fruit Park, Jayengrono Park, and others. Bungkul Park was awarded the Asian Townscape Award 2013 from the United Nations as the best park in Asia because of its complete and integrated facilities, including the economic area (street food centers), green open area, disability-friendly area, free internet (Wi-Fi), and regular garden maintenance.

The city of Surabaya is very outstanding in the field of environment. The city has won many awards in the field of environment and city planning both nationally and internationally. These awards have included Adipura, Adipura kencana, Adiwiyata, Wahyu Tata Nugraha, and other green awards, the Adipura Cup, which Surabaya won several times in the 1980s and 1990s, the Adipura Kencana trophy, the cleanest metropolitan city category in the 1990s and in the period of 2010 to 2017, seven consecutive times, as well as the Adipura trophy, plenary in 2016. The city also received several awards from the central government as one of the major cities with the best air quality in Indonesia. Surabaya in 2012 has won the award "City of the Best Participation in the Asia Pacific" by Citynet for the success of the city government and people's participation in managing the environment. Surabaya has also been awarded the ASEAN Environmentally Sustainable City Award or "the city with the best sustainable environmental management in ASEAN" in 2011 and 2014. In 2018, Surabaya won the Lee Kuan Yew City Prize along with Hamburg, Kazan, and Tokyo, on the basis of the ability to maintain and manage villages in the middle of the city with excellent government management and community participation amid the rapidly developing city. Surabaya became the first city in Indonesia to receive this award. On the other hand, however, there are not a few areas in Surabaya that appear less organised, especially in the neighborhoods of Southern and Northern Surabaya. This is the concern of the city government to reorganise the environment of the region.

=== Climate ===
Surabaya features a tropical wet and dry climate (Köppen: Aw), with distinct wet and dry seasons. The city's wet season runs from October through May, while the dry season covers the remaining four months. Unlike many cities and regions with a tropical wet and dry climate, average high and low temperatures are very consistent throughout the year, with an average high temperature of around 31 °C and average low temperatures around 23 °C. Summer months (December to February) are the wettest months, while spring months (September to November) are the hottest months.

Climate data for Surabaya (Juanda International Airport) (1991–2020 normals)
Month	Jan	Feb	Mar	Apr	May	Jun	Jul	Aug	Sep	Oct	Nov	Dec	Year
Mean daily maximum °C (°F)	32.1 (89.8)	32.0 (89.6)	32.1 (89.8)	32.0 (89.6)	31.9 (89.4)	31.4 (88.5)	31.1 (88.0)	31.3 (88.3)	32.4 (90.3)	33.5 (92.3)	33.5 (92.3)	32.5 (90.5)	32.2 (89.9)
Daily mean °C (°F)	27.3 (81.1)	27.2 (81.0)	27.7 (81.9)	28.2 (82.8)	28.3 (82.9)	27.7 (81.9)	27.1 (80.8)	27.1 (80.8)	27.8 (82.0)	28.9 (84.0)	28.8 (83.8)	27.9 (82.2)	27.8 (82.1)
Mean daily minimum °C (°F)	24.6 (76.3)	24.5 (76.1)	24.8 (76.6)	25.3 (77.5)	25.0 (77.0)	24.2 (75.6)	23.3 (73.9)	22.8 (73.0)	23.1 (73.6)	24.7 (76.5)	25.4 (77.7)	25.0 (77.0)	24.4 (75.9)
Average precipitation mm (inches)	395.1 (15.56)	383.9 (15.11)	319.6 (12.58)	235.5 (9.27)	150.8 (5.94)	79.7 (3.14)	40.0 (1.57)	37.5 (1.48)	9.8 (0.39)	54.3 (2.14)	139.2 (5.48)	279.9 (11.02)	2,125.3 (83.68)
Average precipitation days	18.9	17.7	17.3	13.5	8.3	4.9	3.0	0.9	0.8	2.9	8.6	14.9	111.7
Mean monthly sunshine hours	141.1	138.1	159.5	172.4	219.7	221.5	250.1	269.7	261.5	250.6	199.4	134.4	2,418
Source: Starlings Roost Weather

== Government and politics ==
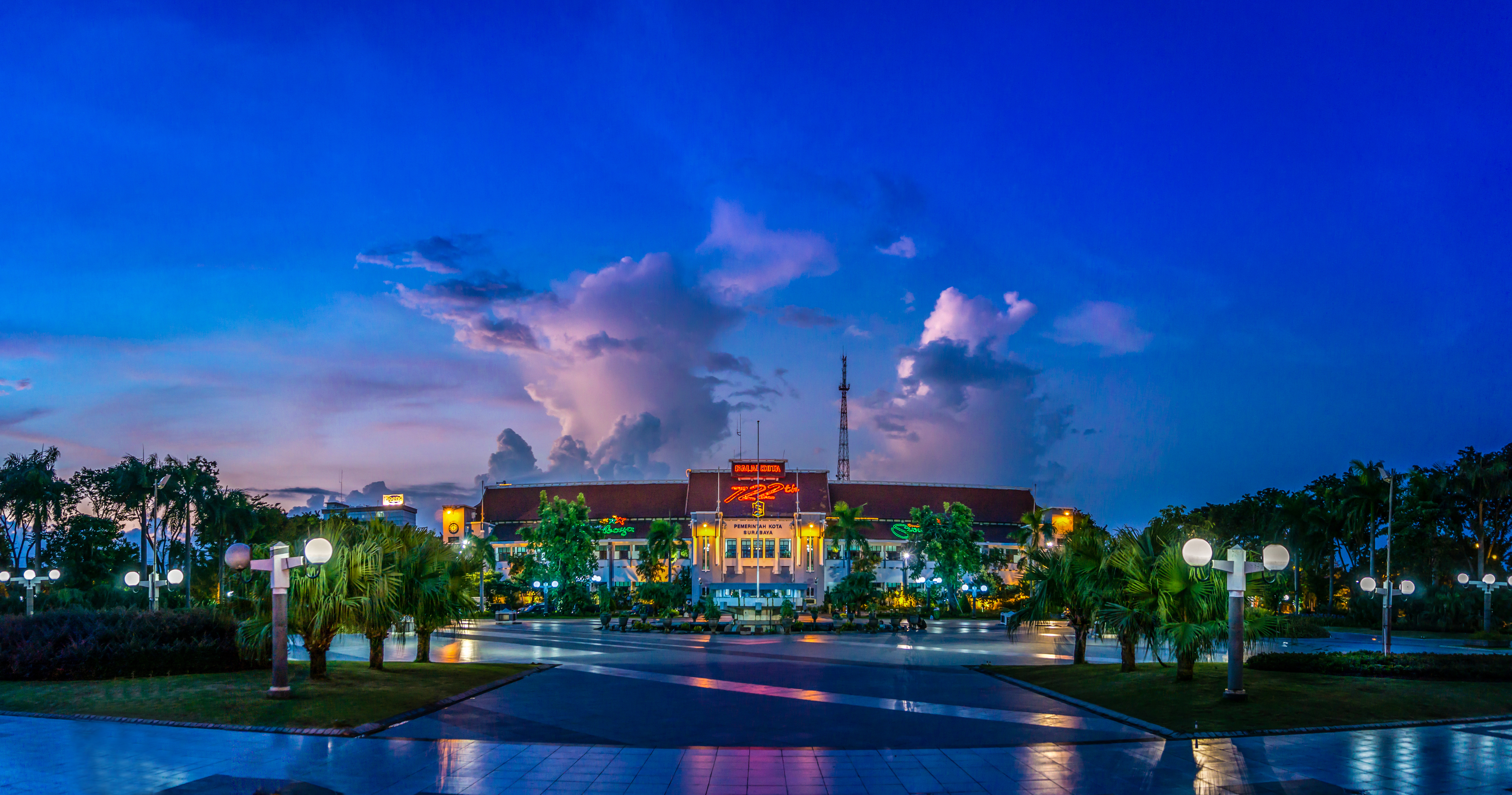
The Surabaya mayor’s office at the Surabaya City Hall

Surabaya is a city with a mayor–council form of government. The city government is responsible for the provision of public education, public health facilities, public safety, civic services, public welfare and public transportation.

The city council, namely the Surabaya City Regional House of Representatives is the unicameral legislative body consisting of 50 members. Both the mayor and the city’s legislative officials are directly elected by the locals every five years, with an exception that the city’s mayor can only have a two consecutive-term limit.

=== Mayor ===
The current mayor is Eri Cahyadi, who was elected in 2020 and has served the city since 26 February 2021. The city's first female mayor is Tri Rismaharini, who has led Surabaya to achieve many regional, national and international awards during her ten-year tenure, from 2010 to 2020. In 2012, Surabaya was awarded the "ASEAN Environmentally Sustainable City Award".

Besides representatives to the city council, Surabaya also sends 8 delegates to the East Java provincial parliament. On a national level, Surabaya is consolidated with the neighboring Sidoarjo Regency to form the East Java I constituency for the Indonesia House of Representatives. Together, they send 10 delegates to the lower house of the national legislature.

The city administration maintains a central command center since 2016, integrating all civic services including Satpol PP, Bakesbangpol and Linmas, Hygiene and Parks Service, Transportation Agency, Public Works Agency of Highways and Extermination, ambulance and fire services. All services can be accessed by dialling 112 number. The city is dubbed as the champion of a smart city in Indonesia and won Indonesia Smart City Index (IKCI) in 2015 and 2018. Surabaya also received an award at the Guangzhou International Award for Urban Innovation in the Online Popular City category and Lee Kuan Yew World City Prize in 2018.

=== Administrative divisions ===
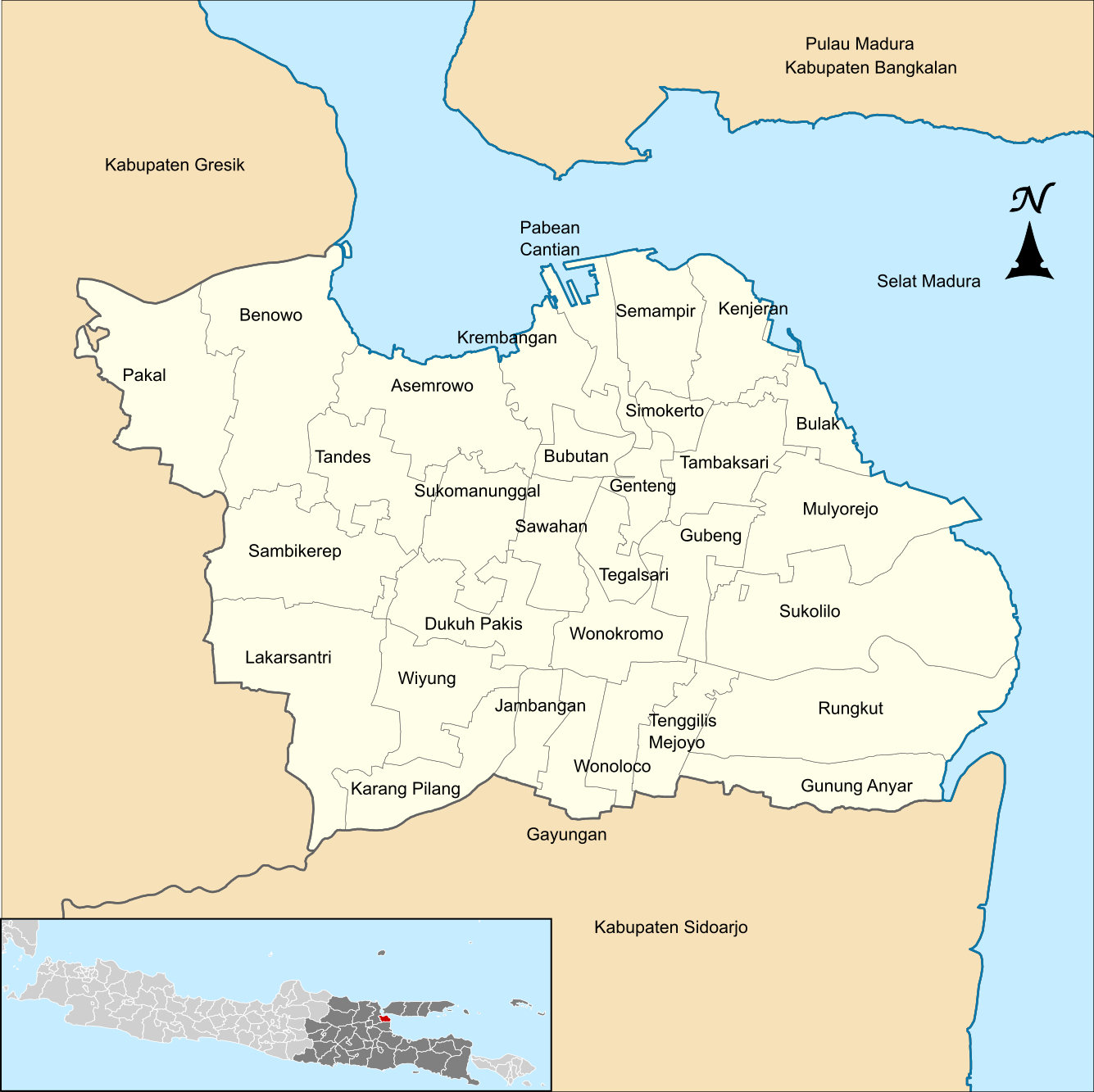
Districts of Surabaya

Surabaya is divided into thirty-one kecamatan (districts), and subdivided into 154 kelurahan (urban villages). The districts are grouped into five areas: Central, North, South, East, and West. The districts are listed below with their areas and their populations at the 2010 Census and the 2020 Census, together with their official estimates as at mid 2025. The table also includes the locations of the district administrative centres, and the number of administrative villages (all classed as urban kelurahan) in each district.

Kode Wilayah	Name of District (kecamatan)	Area in km^{2}	Pop'n Census 2010	Pop'n Census 2020	Pop'n Estimate mid 2025	Admin centre	No. of villages	Post codes
35.78.01	Karangpilang ꦏꦫꦁꦥꦶꦭꦁ	9.44	72,469	74,796	75,164	Kebraon ꦏꦧꦿꦲꦺꦴꦤ꧀	4	60221 - 60223
35.78.23	Jambangan ꦗꦩ꧀ꦧꦁꦔꦤ꧀	4.12	46,430	50,470	54,140	Jambangan ꦗꦩ꧀ꦧꦁꦔꦤ꧀	4	60232 - 60233
35.78.22	Gayungan ꦒꦪꦸꦁꦔꦤ꧀	5.91	42,717	41,289	43,480	Gayungan ꦒꦪꦸꦁꦔꦤ꧀	4	60231 - 60235
35.78.02	Wonocolo ꦮꦤꦕꦭ	6.54	80,276	75,315	79,530	Jemur Wonosari ꦗꦼꦩꦸꦂꦮꦤꦱꦫꦶ	5	60236 - 60239
35.78.24	Tenggilis Mejoyo ꦠꦼꦁꦒꦶꦭꦶꦱ꧀ꦩꦗꦪ	5.81	72,467	61,187	58,645	Panjang Jiwo ꦥꦚ꧀ꦗꦁꦗꦶꦮ	4	60291 - 60299
35.78.25	Gunung Anyar ꦒꦸꦤꦸꦁꦲꦚꦂ	10.15	62,120	62,482	62,669	Gunung Anyar ꦒꦸꦤꦸꦁꦲꦚꦂ	4	60293 - 60294
35.78.03	Rungkut ꦫꦸꦁꦏꦸꦠ꧀	22.94	121,084	123,757	123,956	Kali Rungkut ꦏꦭꦶꦫꦸꦁꦏꦸꦢ꧀	6	60293 - 60298
35.78.09	Sukolilo ꦯꦸꦏꦭꦶꦭ	30.18	119,873	110,557	115,944	Menur Pumpungan ꦩꦼꦤꦸꦂꦥꦸꦩ꧀ꦥꦸꦁꦔꦤ꧀	7	60111 - 60119
35.78.26	Mulyorejo ꦩꦸꦭꦾꦉꦗ	17.37	94,728	86,545	87,932	Mulyorejo ꦩꦸꦭꦾꦉꦗ	6	60112 - 60116
35.78.08	Gubeng ꦒꦸꦧꦼꦁ	7.93	128,127	123,961	131,164	Airlangga ꦲꦻꦂꦭꦁꦒꦃ	6	60281 - 60286
35.78.04	Wonokromo ꦮꦤꦏꦿꦩ	8.28	133,211	144,650	151,571	Darmo ꦣꦂꦩ	6	60241 - 60246
35.78.21	Dukuh Pakis ꦝꦸꦏꦸꦃꦥꦏꦶꦱ꧀	10.27	64,249	56,707	59,185	Pradah KaliKendal ꦥꦿꦝꦃꦏꦭꦶꦏꦼꦟ꧀ꦝꦭ꧀	4	60224 - 60226
35.78.20	Wiyung ꦮꦶꦪꦸꦁ	12.15	67,987	71,605	76,770	Wiyung ꦮꦶꦪꦸꦁ	4	60222 - 60229
35.78.18	Lakarsantri ꦭꦏꦂꦯꦤ꧀ꦠꦿꦶ	18.71	51,195	59,256	65,497	Jeruk ꦗꦼꦫꦸꦏ꧀	6	60211 - 60215
35.78.31	Sambikerep ꦯꦩ꧀ꦧꦶꦏꦼꦉꦥ꧀	17.45	61,101	63,778	69,584	Sambikerep ꦯꦩ꧀ꦧꦶꦏꦼꦉꦥ꧀	4	60216 - 60219
35.78.14	Tandes ꦡꦟ꧀ꦝꦼꦱ꧀	10.07	103,084	87,511	90,999	Balongsari ꦧꦭꦺꦴꦁꦱꦫꦶ	6	60184 - 60187
35.78.27	Sukomanunggal ꦱꦸꦏꦩꦤꦸꦁꦒꦭ꧀	9.38	100,612	101,259	102,681	Simomulyo ꦱꦶꦩꦩꦸꦭꦾ	6	60187 - 60189
35.78.06	Sawahan ꦯꦮꦃꦲꦤ꧀	7.16	170,605	188,693	196,811	Putat Jaya ꦥꦸꦠꦠ꧀ꦗꦪꦃ	6	60253 - 60256
35.78.05	Tegalsari ꦠꦼꦒꦭ꧀ꦱꦫꦶ	4.33	85,606	92,014	96,237	Keputran ꦏꦥꦸꦠꦿꦤ꧀	5	60261 - 60265
35.78.07	Genteng ꦒꦼꦟ꧀ꦛꦺꦁ	4.09	46,548	52,924	57,255	Ketabang ꦏꦼꦠꦧꦁ	5	60271 - 60275
35.78.10	Tambaksari ꦠꦩ꧀ꦧꦏ꧀ꦱꦫꦶ	8.97	204,805	214,966	225,939	Pacar Keling ꦥꦕꦂꦏꦼꦭꦶꦁ	8	60131 - 60138
35.78.17	Kenjeran ꦏꦺꦚ꧀ꦗꦺꦂꦫꦤ꧀	8.52	163,438	181,325	186,189	Tanah Kali Kedinding ꦠꦤꦃꦏꦭꦶꦏꦼꦝꦶꦟ꧀ꦝꦶꦁ	4	60126 - 60129
35.78.29	Bulak ꦨꦸꦭꦏ꧀	1.26	37,214	43,764	48,118	Bulak ꦨꦸꦭꦏ꧀	4	60121 - 60125
35.78.11	Simokerto ꦱꦶꦩꦏꦽꦠ	2.63	79,319	86,897	90,663	Tambakrejo ꦠꦩ꧀ꦧꦏ꧀ꦉꦗ	5	60141 - 60145
35.78.16	Semampir ꦱꦼꦩꦩ꧀ꦥꦶꦂ	9.07	151,429	172,669	181,769	Ujung ꦲꦸꦗꦸꦁ	5	60151 - 60155
35.78.12	Pabean Cantian ꦥꦧꦺꦪꦤ꧀ꦕꦤ꧀ꦠꦶꦪꦤ꧀	5.48	69,423	70,808	72,505	Krembangan Utara ꦏꦉꦩ꧀ꦧꦁꦔꦤ꧀ꦲꦸꦠꦫꦃ	5	60161 - 60165
35.78.13	Bubutan ꦨꦸꦨꦸꦠ꧀ꦠꦤ꧀	3.91	84,465	90,646	95,522	Bubutan ꦨꦸꦨꦸꦠ꧀ꦠꦤ꧀	5	60171 - 68174
35.78.15	Krembangan ꦑꦉꦩ꧀ꦧꦔꦤ꧀	8.79	106,664	109,027	113,890	Morokrembangan ꦩꦫꦏꦉꦩ꧀ꦧꦁꦔꦤ꧀	5	60175 - 60179
35.78.28	Asemrowo ꦄꦱꦼꦩ꧀ꦬꦮ	15.37	42,704	45,547	48,849	Asemrowo ꦄꦱꦼꦩ꧀ꦬꦮ	3	60182 - 60184
35.78.19	Benowo ꦨꦼꦤꦮ	29.64	54,133	69,938	75,716	Sememi ꦱꦼꦩꦼꦩꦶ	4	60191 - 60199
35.78.30	Pakal ꦦꦏꦭ꧀	18.58	47,404	59,971	65,486	Babat Jerawat ꦧꦧꦢ꧀ꦗꦿꦮꦠ꧀	4	60192 - 60197
Totals		334.50	2,768,225	2,874,314	3,003,860	Genteng ꦒꦼꦟ꧀ꦛꦺꦁ	154	

Notes: (a) except the 2 kelurahan of Simomulyo and Simomulyo Baru, which have the postcode of 60281.

== Demographics ==
Historical population
Year	Pop.	±%
1945	618,000	—
1950	715,000	+15.7%
1961	1,008,000	+41.0%
1971	1,556,255	+54.4%
1980	2,008,335	+29.0%
1990	2,467,089	+22.8%
2000	2,610,519	+5.8%
2010	2,768,225	+6.0%
2020	2,874,314	+3.8%
2024	3,018,022	+5.0%
Source: Various sources 1945–1961 : Surabaya: City of Work 1971–2025 : Statistics Indonesia (BPS)

Surabaya is the second-most populous city in Indonesia, with 2,874,314 inhabitants recorded in the chartered city limits (kota) in the 2020 census; the official estimate as at mid 2024 was 3,018,022. With the extended metropolitan development area called Gerbangkertosusila (derived from Gresik-Bangkalan-Mojokerto-Surabaya-Sidoarjo-Lamongan) adding more than 12 million inhabitants in several cities and around 50 districts spread over noncontiguous urban areas including Gresik, Sidoarjo, Mojokerto, and Pasuruan regencies. The central government of Indonesia recognises only the metropolitan area (Surabaya, Gresik, and Sidoarjo) as Greater Surabaya (Zona Surabaya Raya) with a population of 8,319,229 (2015), making Surabaya now the second-largest metropolitan area in Indonesia. The OECD recognizes a larger definition for the metropolitan area with a population of 10,695,358 (2020), while the United Nations Department of Economic and Social Affairs recognizes a smaller-than-official definition with a population of approximately 6,844,000 (2025). The city is highly urbanised, with industries centralised in the city, and contains slums. As a leading education center, the city is also home for students from around Indonesia.

Surabaya is an old city that has expanded over time, and its population has continued to grow at roughly 2.2% per year. In recent years, more people have moved to Surabaya from nearby suburbs and villages in East Java.

=== Ethnicity ===
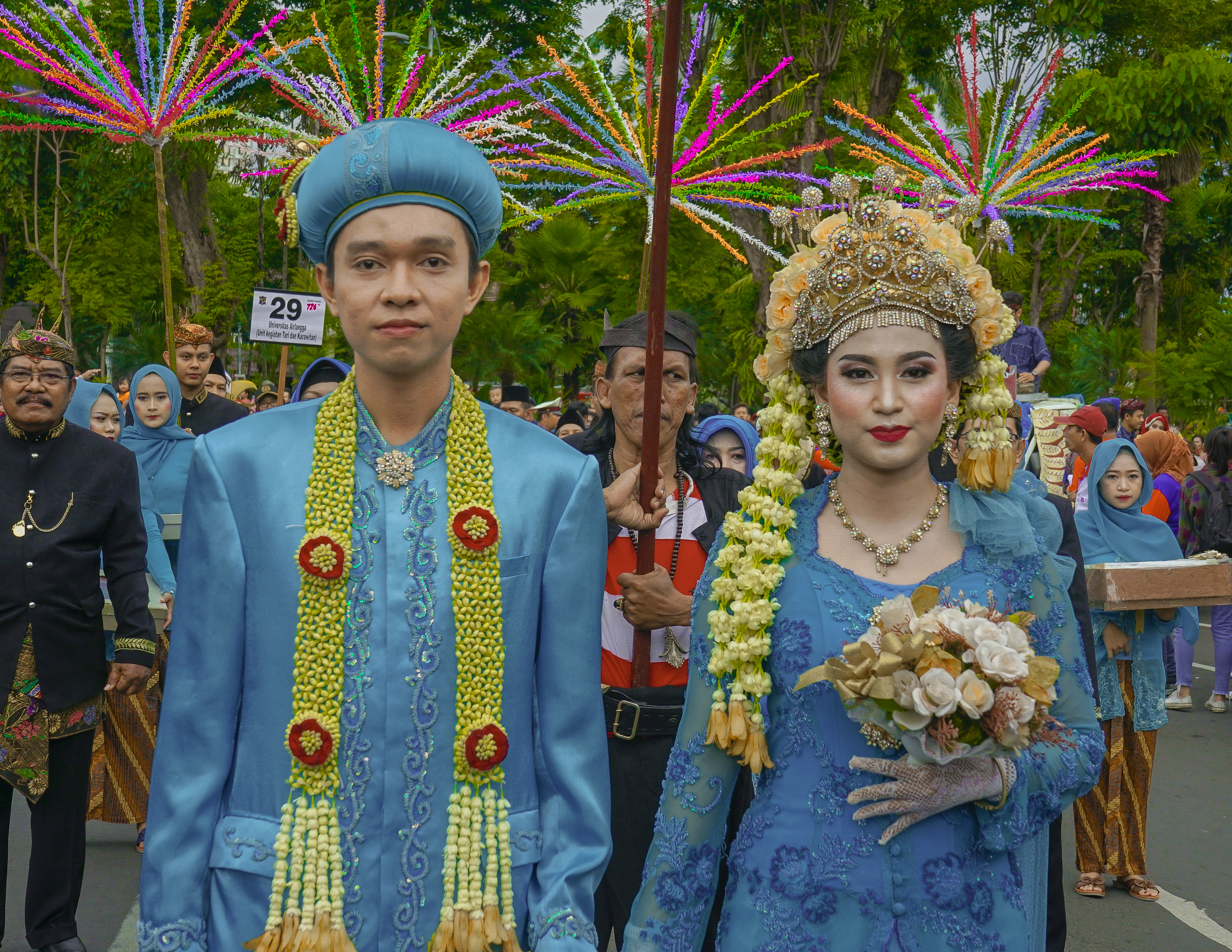
Manten Pegon, traditional wedding attire from Surabaya

Javanese people form the majority in Surabaya, with about 83 percent of the population, while the Madurese and Chinese are significant minorities, each making up about 7 percent of the population. Smaller groups include Arabs, especially the Hadhrami people who originate from the Hadhramaut region in Yemen, Armenians, and Jewish people. Surabaya also has ethnic populations from other parts of Indonesia: Sundanese, Minang, Batak, Banjar, and Balinese.

As one of Indonesia's educational destinations, Surabaya is also the residence of students from various regions of the country, who may form communities based on the region they come from. Most come from the Eastern part of Indonesia, including those who are Papuan, Minahasan or Bugis, as well as people from Timor and others.

Because it is a regional trade hub, many foreigners (expatriates) live in Surabaya, especially in the western part of the city. There are also communities of Koreans, Japanese, Indians and westerners in the city.

=== Language ===
Most citizens speak a dialect of East Javanese called Suroboyoan, a subdialect of the Arekan dialect. A stereotype of this dialect concerns equality and directness in speech. The use of register is less strict than the standardized Central Java dialect. The Suroboyoan dialect is a mixture of both Indonesian and Javanese, also with some significant influence from foreign languages such as Madurese, which has formed a distinctive dialect known as Suroboyoan. The Suroboyoan dialect is actively promoted in local media, such as in local TV shows, radio, newspapers, and traditional dramas called Ludruk. The speakers of Suroboyoan dialect are well known for being proud of their distinctive dialect and consistently maintain it wherever they go.

=== Religion ===
Religion in Surabaya (2019 Census)
1. Islam (86.0%)
2. Christianity (12.8%)
3. Buddhism (1.42%)
4. Hinduism (0.25%)
5. Confucianism and others (0.03%)

Although around 85% of citizens in Surabaya adhere to Islam, other major religions include Christianity, of whom the majority are Roman Catholics. The influence of Hinduism is strong in basic Surabayan culture, but only a minority of the population adheres to Hinduism, mostly among the ethnic Indian and Balinese minorities. Also, a significant population of Chinese Indonesians adhere to Buddhism and Confucianism, and a small community of Dutch Jews and Iraqi Jews follow Judaism.

The city had an influential role as a major Islamic center in Java during the Wali Sanga era. The prominent and honored Islamic figure in Surabaya was Sunan Ampel (Raden Rahmat). His tomb is a sacred religious site in the city and is visited by Surabayans and pilgrims from different parts of Indonesia. The largest Muslim organisation in Indonesia, Nahdlatul Ulama, was established in Surabaya on 31 January 1926. Al-Akbar Mosque is the largest mosque in the city and one of the largest mosque in the world.

Christianity as a whole is mainly practised by Chinese Indonesians, as well as native Javanese, Bataks, and Ambonese who attend either a Roman Catholic or Protestant church. A minority of Javanese worship at Greja Kristen Jawi Wetan, a syncretic religious movement that combines Christianity with the traditional religion of Java. Around 15 churches are in Surabaya; they vary in size. The Church of the Birth of Our Lady, also known as Gereja Kepanjen, was built in 1815 as the first church in Surabaya and is one of the oldest churches in Indonesia. Graha Bethany Nginden, is a megachurch which is one of the largest churches in Surabaya, Indonesia and Southeast Asia. The main Orthodox Church in Indonesia, St Nikolas Church, is also based in Surabaya. The Orthodox Christian Center Surabaya was opened on 15 October 2008.

Once the major religion in Surabaya and across the archipelago during the Janggala and Majapahit era, Hinduism played a major role in traditional Surabayan culture. Small Hindu communities still exist, most commonly in the eastern sections of the city. Surabaya was the location of the only synagogue in Java, but it rarely obtained a minyan (quorum). The synagogue was demolished in 2013 by unidentified people while the city council was in the process of registering it as a heritage site. In the years before its demolition, it had been the site of many anti-Israel protests. A Jewish cemetery exists in the city.

== Economy ==
Since the early 1900s, Surabaya has been one of the most important and busiest trading city ports in Asia. Principal exports from the port include sugar, tobacco, and coffee. Its rich history as a trading port has led to a strong financial infrastructure with modern economic institutions such as banks, insurance, and sound export-import companies. The economy is influenced by the recent growth in international industries and the completion of the Suramadu Bridge. The high potential and economic activities make the city an attractive destination to foreign investors. The city is home to a large shipyard and numerous specialized naval schools. The Bank of Indonesia has also made plans for Surabaya to be the Islamic financial center of Indonesia.

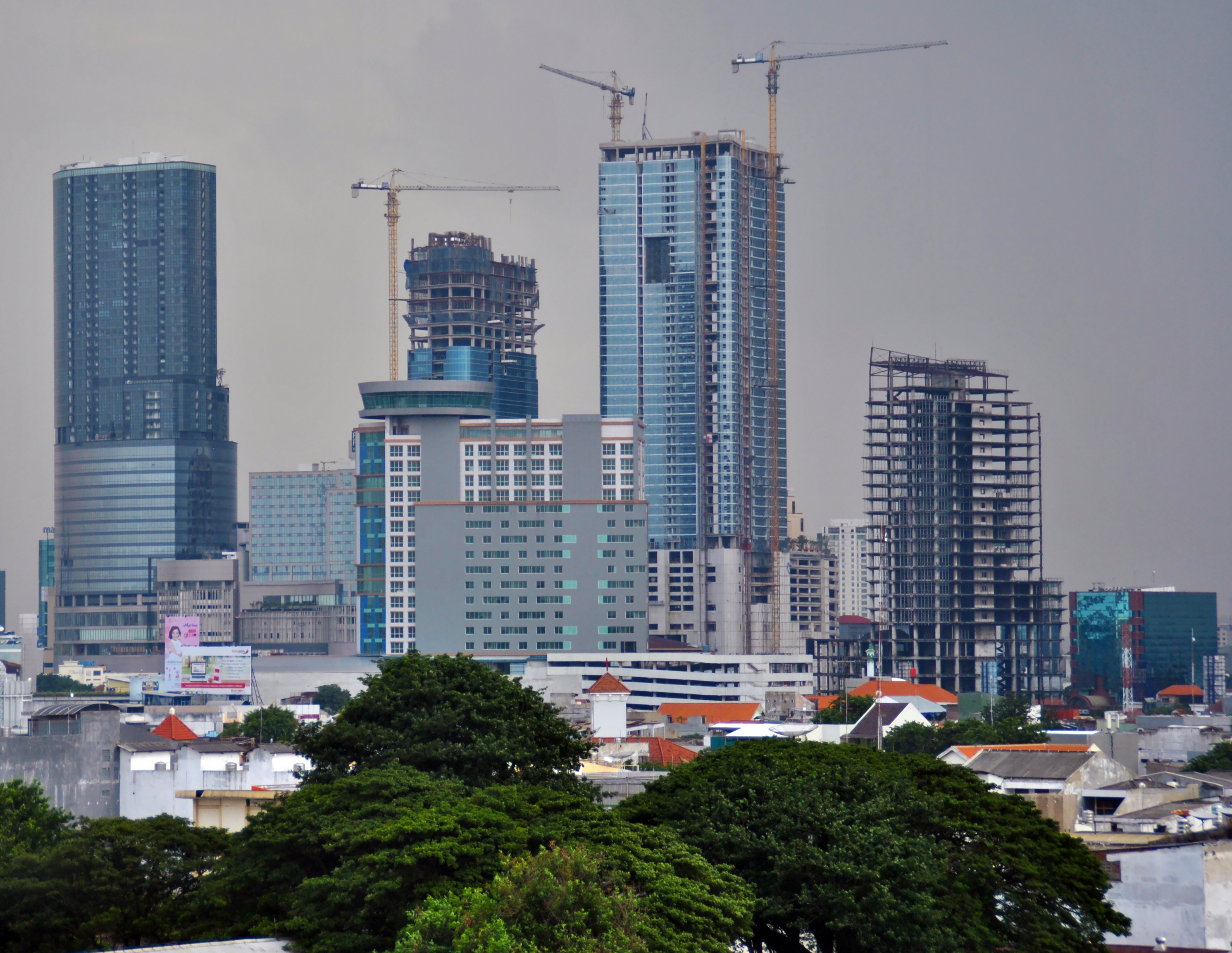
Tunjungan, main central business district of Surabaya

As the provincial capital, Surabaya has numerous offices and business centers; as a metropolitan city, it became the center of economic, financial, and business activities in East Java and beyond. Also, Surabaya is the second-largest port city in Indonesia after Jakarta. As a trading center, Surabaya is not only a trade center for East Java, but also facilitates areas in Central Java, Kalimantan, and Eastern Indonesia. Surabaya's strategic location in almost in the center of Indonesia and just south of Asia makes it one of the critical hubs for trading activities in Southeast Asia. It is currently in the process of building high-rise skyscrapers, including apartments, condominiums, and hotels to attract foreign capital. Surabaya and the surrounding area are undergoing the most rapidly growing and the most advanced economic development in Indonesia. The city is also one of the most essential cities in supporting Indonesia's economy.Surabaya's strategic position on the Java Sea and its role as a major inter-island shipping hub have made the city an important component of Indonesia's maritime connectivity, particularly between Java and eastern Indonesia.

Most of the population is engaged in services, industry, and trade. Surabaya is a fast-growing trading center. Major industries include shipbuilding, heavy equipment, food processing and agriculture, electronics, home furnishings, and handicrafts. Many major multinational companies are based in Surabaya, such as Sampoerna, Maspion, Wings Group, Unilever Indonesia, Pakuwon Group, Jawa Pos Group, and PAL Indonesia.

=== Shopping ===
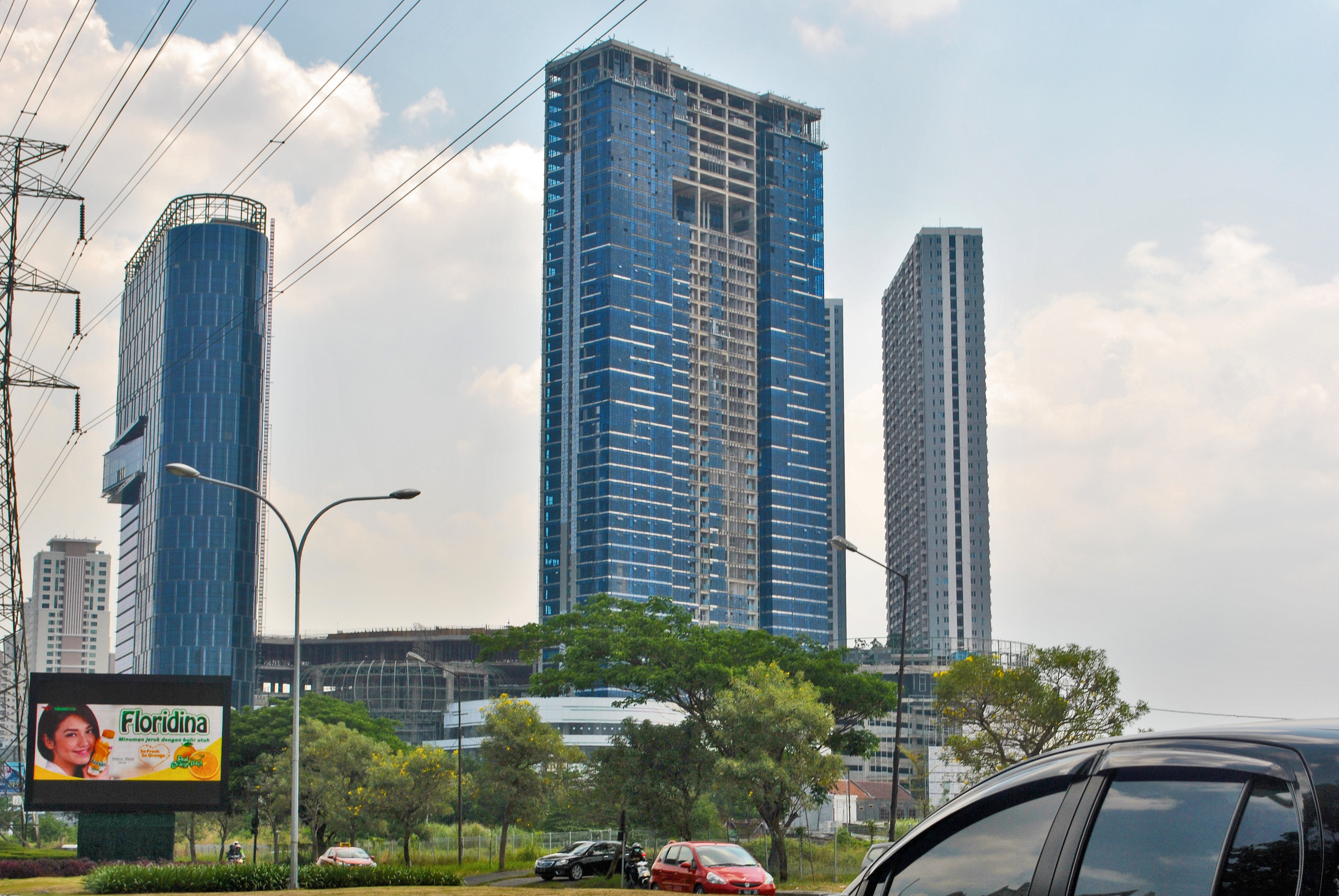
Pakuwon Mall is the largest mall in Surabaya and also in Indonesia, followed by Tunjungan Plaza

Surabaya has plenty of shopping centers like other major cities of Indonesia, ranging from traditional markets to most modern shopping malls. Outlets of local and international brands have a presence in modern shopping malls. There were about 100 hectares/one million square metres of retail space in Surabaya by the end of 2016. There are many dedicated markets for electronic goods, gadgets and computer hardware.

Some important shopping malls of the city which are Ciputra World Surabaya, City of Tomorrow, Royal Plaza Surabaya, Pakuwon City Mall, Galaxy Mall, Grand City Mall, Marvell City, Pakuwon Mall, and Tunjungan Plaza.

== Infrastructure ==
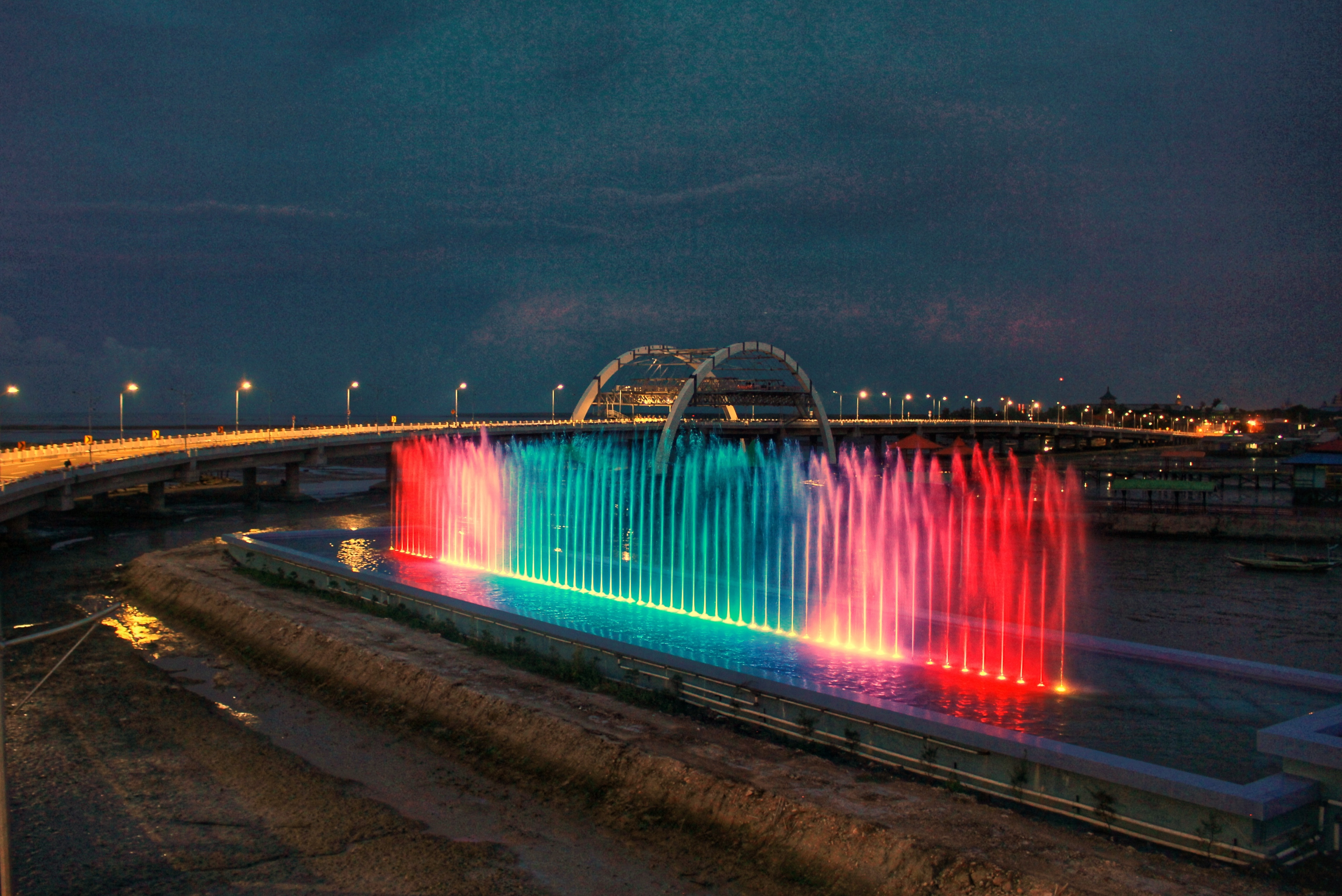
Kenjeran Bridge during night with dancing fountain

Until 2009, the growth of road length in Surabaya was only about 0.01% per year. This is not comparable to the growth of motorized vehicles which reaches around 7–8% annually. Congestion that occurred in Surabaya was triggered by the growth of vehicles that were not proportional to the capacity of the road. To reduce congestion, the city government has built many new roads, including the construction of a frontage road on Ahmad Yani road which is divided into east and west sides of 4 km each. This slow lane is planned to penetrate to the Buduran area, Sidoarjo Regency. In addition, the municipal government has completed the construction of the Middle East Ring Road (MERR) or Dr. Ir. H. Soekarno Boulevard, which is a 10.98 km ring road between the Kenjeran area to Tambak Sumur that connects the Suramadu Bridge and Juanda International Airport; and the 780-meter Suroboyo Bridge that crosses the sea which is now a tourist icon in the Kenjeran Beach area. The city government has also intensified the construction of massive box culverts in Surabaya to reduce congestion while anticipating flooding.

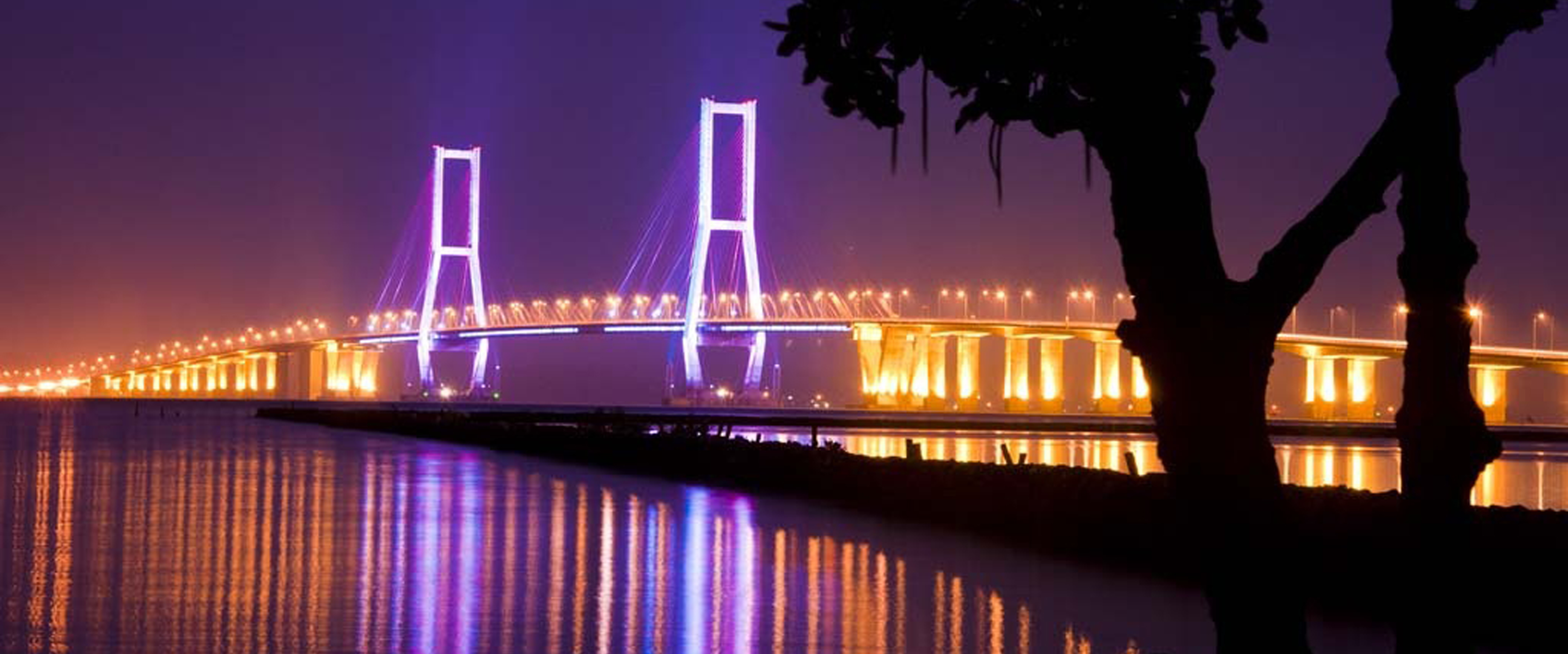
Suramadu Bridge, Indonesia's longest sea-bridge and connecting from Java to Madura Island

The municipal government is also working on the construction of two new ring roads, namely the 17 km Outer East Ring Road (OERR) between the Kenjeran area to Gunung Anyar which also connects the Suramadu Bridge and Juanda International Airport and the West Outer Ring Road ( West Outer Ring Road (WORR) along 26.1 km between the Romokalisari area to Lakarsantri which connects the southern area of Surabaya with Teluk Lamong Harbor Terminal. In addition to building the ring road, the city government has completed the construction of an underpass on Jalan Mayjen Sungkono, and plans to build an underpass and flyover on Jalan Ahmad Yani. The problem of flooding is also a serious threat to city residents. To anticipate the occurrence of flooding, the city government has built many pump houses spread across several points in Surabaya, including Mulyorejo and Jemursari. In addition to pump houses, the city government has also built many parks that are used as sources of water absorption as well as areas for residents to interact, as well as carry out intensive cleaning and maintenance of major rivers in Surabaya. To accommodate the needs of pedestrians and tourists, the Surabaya city government has built bicycle lanes on many protocol roads in Surabaya, as well as pedestrian paths that are almost evenly distributed throughout the Surabaya area.

=== Highways ===
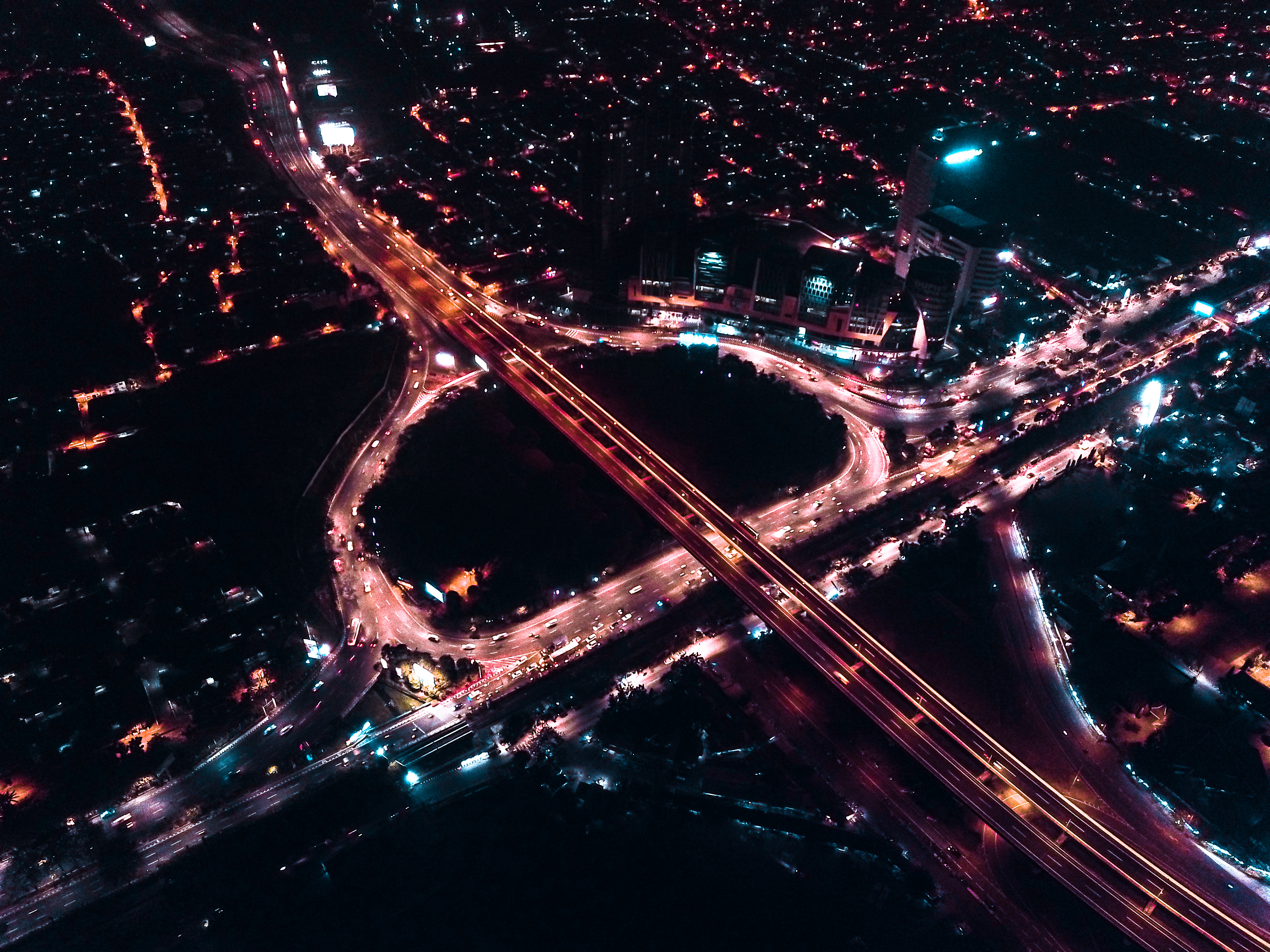
Birdview of Waru interchange at night

The highways that are connected to Surabaya are the Surabaya-Gresik segment which connects Surabaya with Gresik and the northern part of East Java, Surabaya-Mojokerto which connects Surabaya with the western part of the province, Surabaya-Gempol which connects Surabaya with the southern part of the province, as well as Waru-Juanda Airport which connects Surabaya with Juanda International Airport. In 2018, President Joko Widodo inaugurated final segments of the Trans-Java Toll Road, fully connecting Jakarta and Surabaya with expressways. The Surabaya-Gempol section is connected to the Gempol-Pandaan section. The Gempol-Pandaan section is connected to the Gempol-Pasuruan section which connects Surabaya with the Horseshoe (Indonesian: Tapak Kuda) area in East Java and the Pandaan-Malang section which connects Surabaya with Malang, the second largest city in East Java.

The Suramadu Bridge (abbreviated of Surabaya-Madura) connects Surabaya and Madura Island over the Madura Strait. A 16 kilometres (9.9 mi) highway has been proposed to be built from the Suramadu Bridge to Madura International Seaport-City in Pernajuh village, Kocah district, Bangkalan, Madura at the cost of approximately Rp. 60 billion (US$7 billion). This container port was built to ease the burden on Surabaya's overloaded Tanjung Perak Port.

=== Transportation ===
The map Transport of Surabaya

Transportation in Surabaya is supported by land and sea infrastructure serving local, regional, and international journeys. Air transport is located at Juanda International Airport, in Sedati, Sidoarjo. Intracity transport is primarily by motor vehicles, motorcycles and taxis with limited public bus transport available. Recently Surabaya has been declared as one of the cities with the worst congestion in Indonesia, according to a survey Surabaya is also a transit city between Jakarta and Bali for ground transportation. Another bus route is between Jakarta and the neighboring island of Madura.

==== Rail-based ====
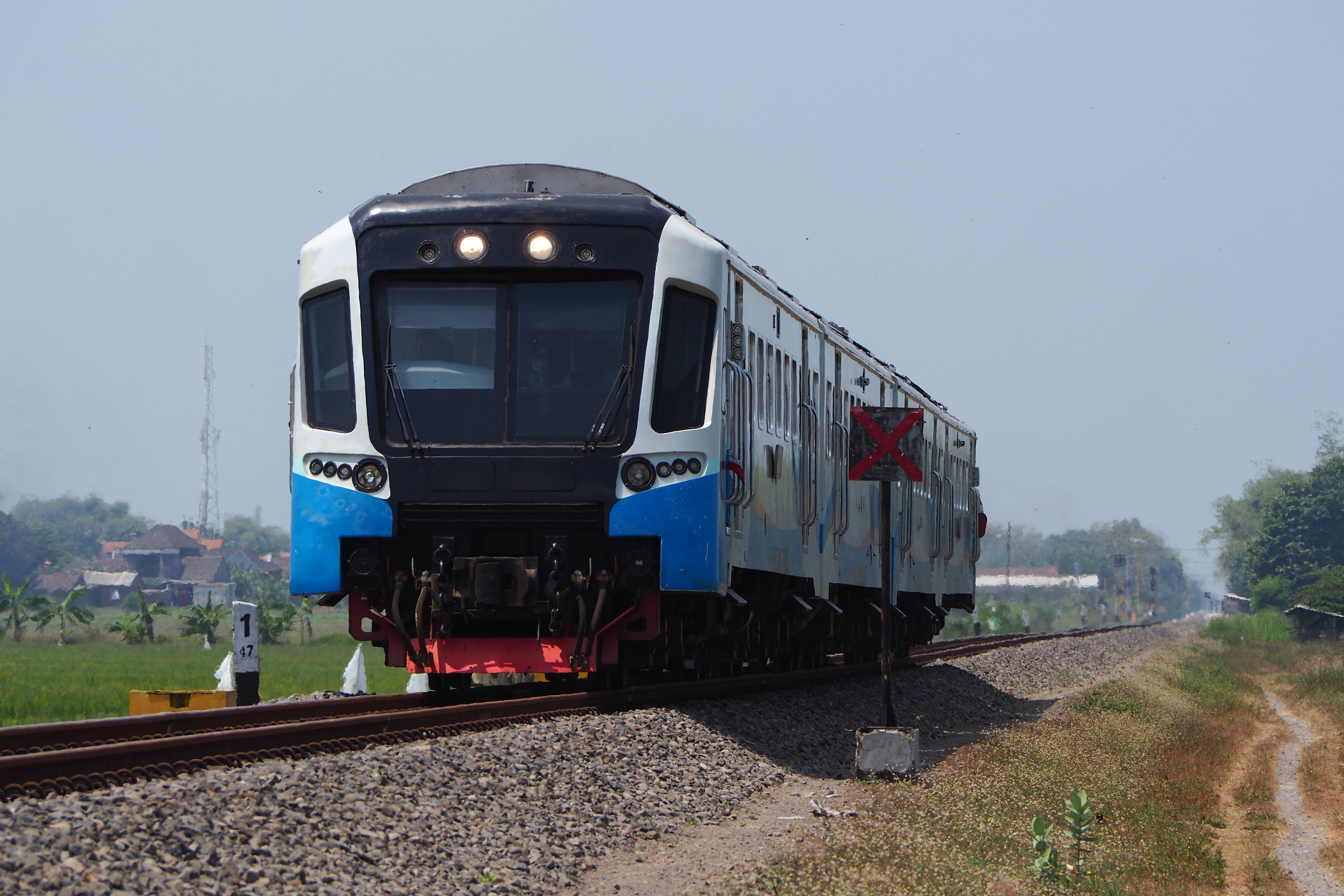
Surabaya Commuter rail with Surabaya–Sidoarjo railway line (KA Jenggala)

Surabaya has three major train stations, being Surabaya Kota (also known as Semut), Surabaya Pasar Turi, and Surabaya Gubeng. The Argo Bromo Anggrek operated by Kereta Api Indonesia (KAI) connects Surabaya from Surabaya Pasar Turi Station to Gambir Station in Jakarta. Both economy and executive class trains are served to and from Surabaya. Surabaya commuter rail has 7 separate lines (as of 2023) that connect Surabaya with surrounding regencies. Their services, also operated by KAI Commuter, have extended into Lamongan, Mojokerto, Sidoarjo, and Pasuruan. Surabaya will become the final destination for a Whoosh High speed rail initiative which connects Jakarta to Surabaya. The Indonesian government currently have a cooperation contract with the investors, and will begin construction in soon.

==== Bus-based ====
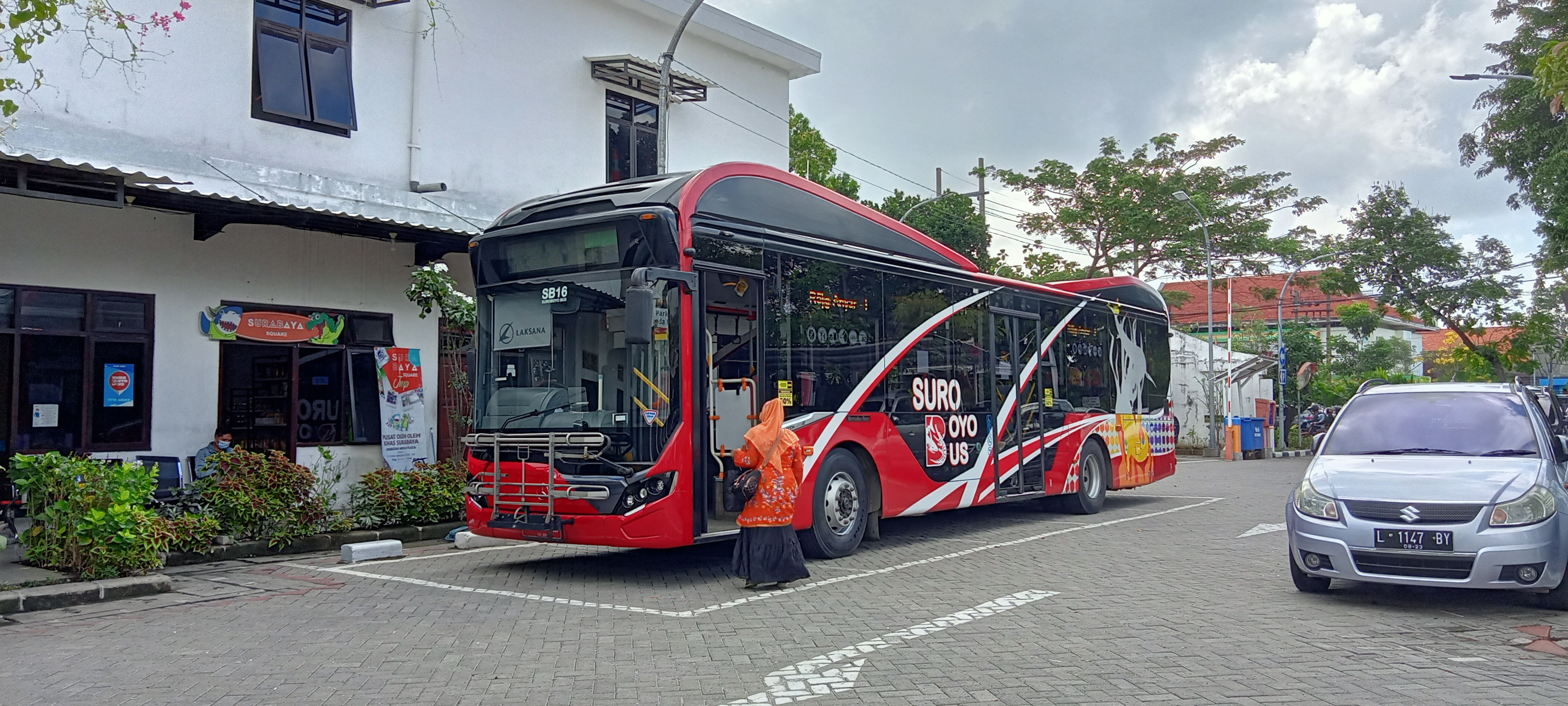
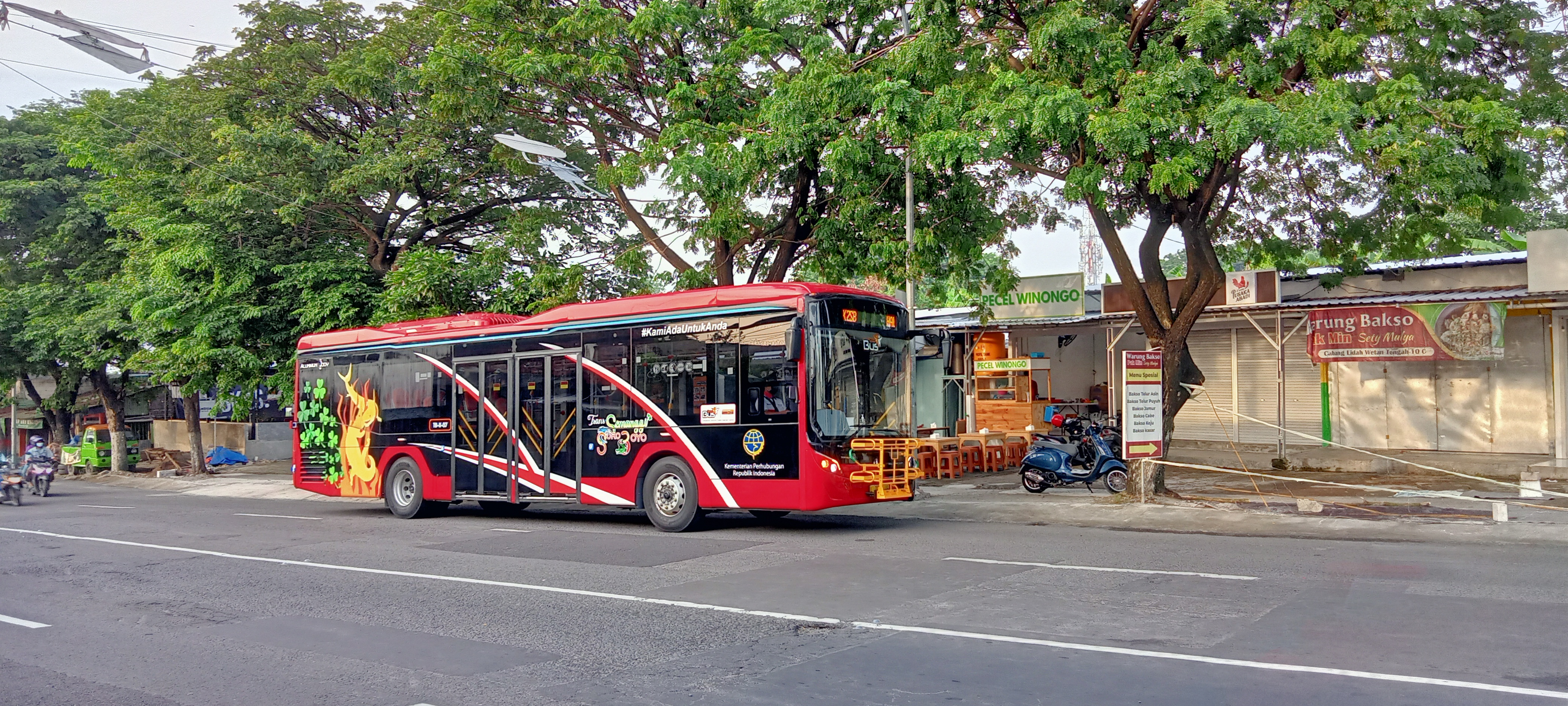
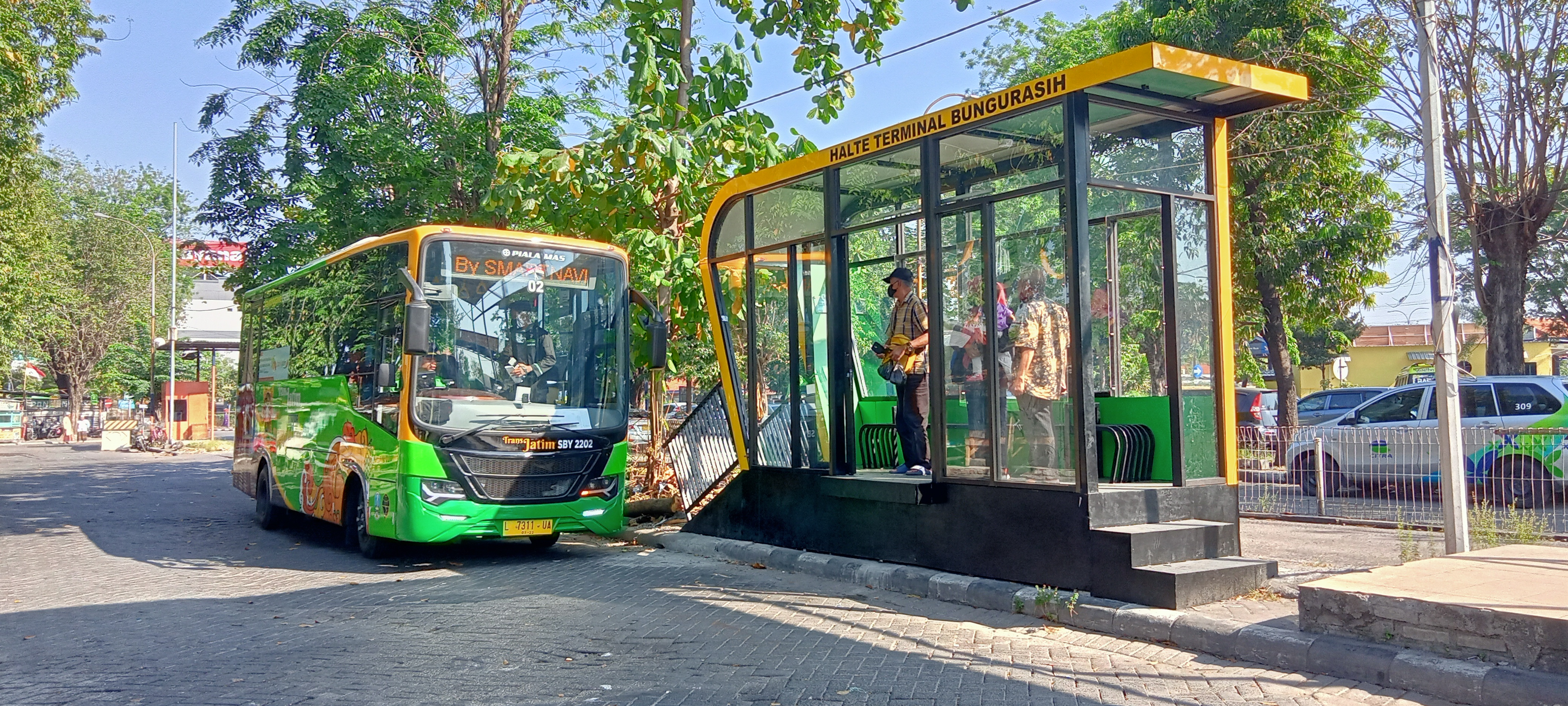
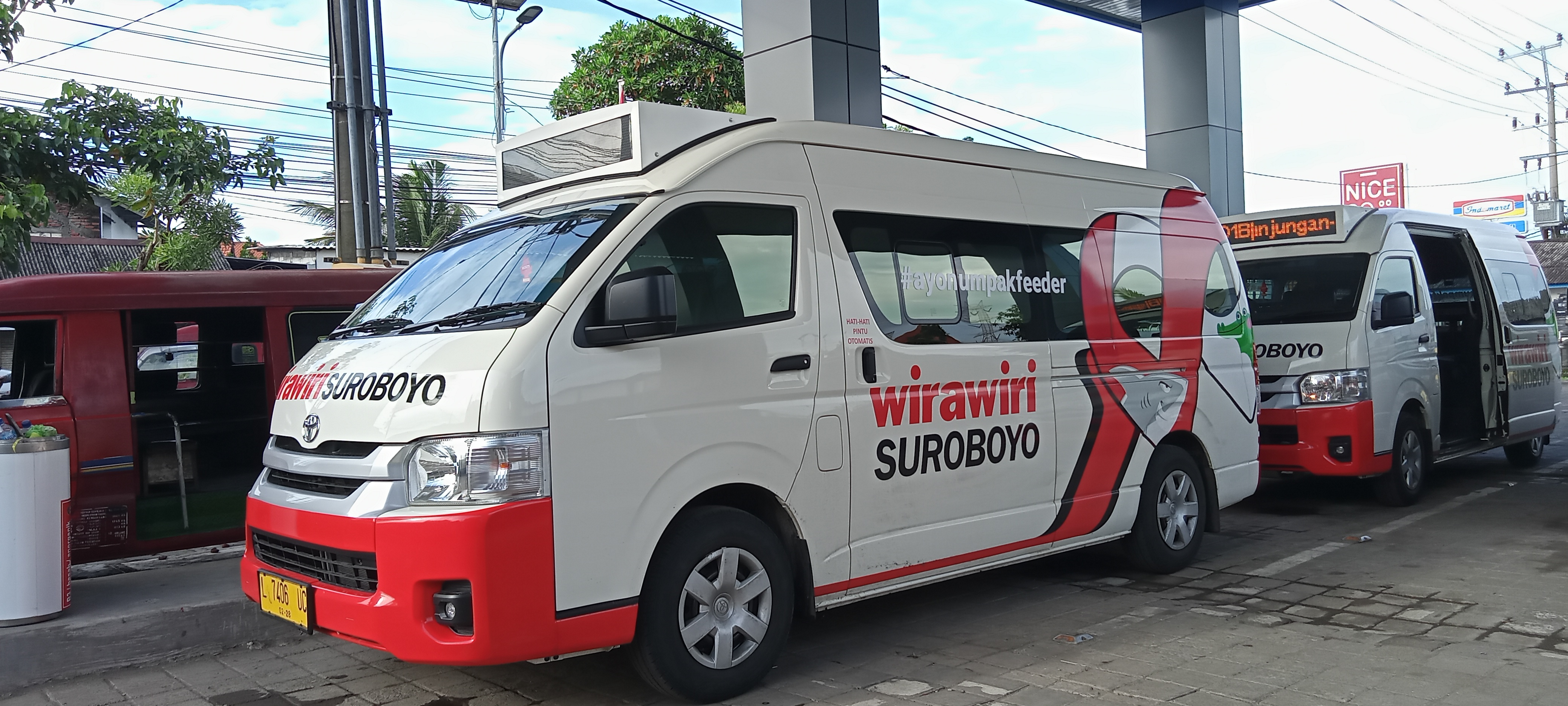
Various bus and minibus-based means of transport in Surabaya; from up to down: Suroboyo Bus, Trans Semanggi Suroboyo, Trans Jatim, and Wirawiri Suroboyo

The main bus terminal is Purabaya Bus Terminal (located in Bungurasih, Waru, Sidoarjo), the other major terminal is Osowilangon in Tambak. In Surabaya it is served by city buses such Suroboyo Bus, Trans Semanggi Suroboyo, Trans Jatim, shuttle bus service (Wira Wiri Suroboyo), and Share taxis is called Angkot as a means of choice for residents of Surabaya and surrounding cities for their daily activities. Surabaya has a number of terminals in the city, including Joyoboyo Terminal, Bratang Terminal, Jembatan Merah Bus Stop, Ujung Baru Bus Stop, and so on. These terminals are meeting points between city buses and other modes of transportation within the city. Since 7 April 2018, the Surabaya city government has launched a city bus system named Suroboyo Bus which serves important points throughout the city. The Suroboyo Bus payment system is unique because it uses plastic waste making Surabaya the second city in the world to implement this system in mass transportation after the Beijing subway in 2014. Suroboyo Bus has small stops scattered throughout the city.

==== Intermodal hub ====
Surabaya's Juanda International Airport is a passenger and cargo airport which also serves as Surabaya's Naval Airbase, operated by the TNI-AL (Indonesian Navy) and located just outside Surabaya, on the outskirts of Sidoarjo. This airport has served Surabaya for many years and currently has two terminals, with domestic flights served from Terminal 1 and all international flights and Garuda Indonesia's domestic flights serviced from Terminal 2.

Port of Tanjung Perak is the main trading port of Surabaya and East Java as a whole. It is one of the busiest ports in the country. It is the second-largest port of trade, container and passenger traffic in Indonesia after the Port of Tanjung Priok in Jakarta. Because of its strategic position and the existence of surrounding advantageous hinterlands, the port constitutes the center of inter island shipping for Eastern Indonesia.

== Culture ==
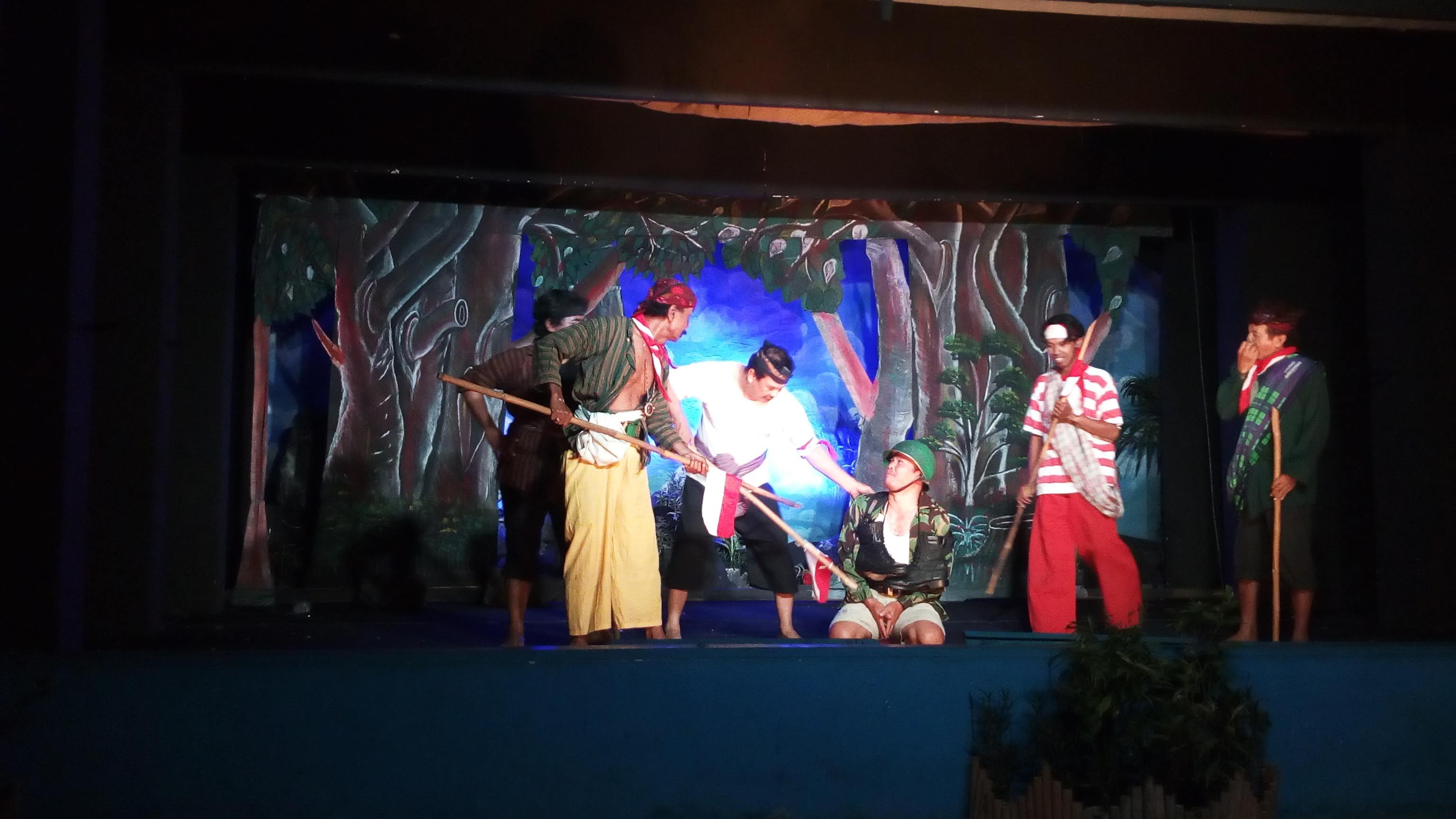
Ludruk is a native Surabaya-genre play (theatre)

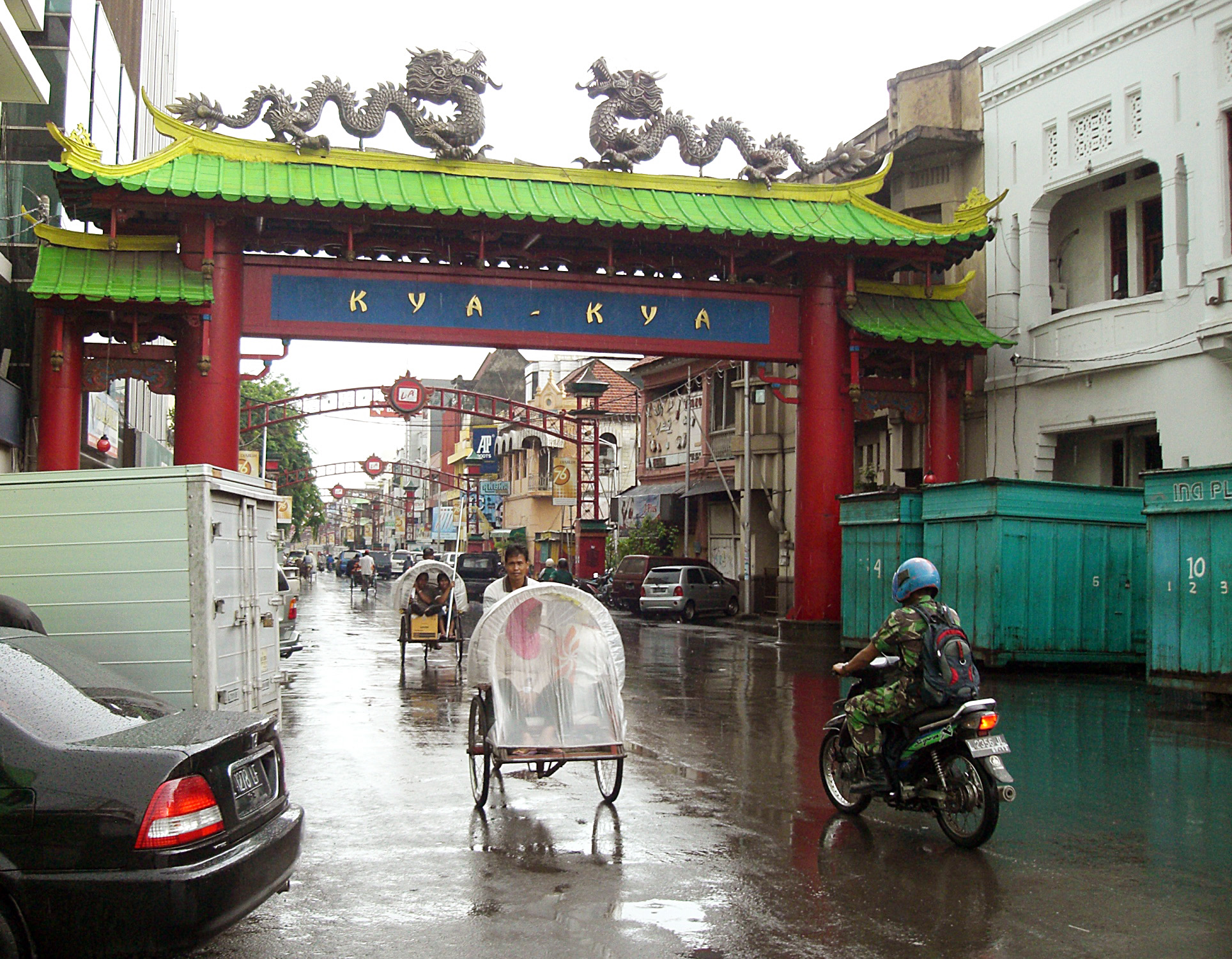
Kya Kya Surabaya (Kembang Jepun) is part of Surabaya’s Chinatown, it has chinese cuisine, barongsai attractions, and chinese heritage buildings.

Javanese culture in Surabaya has distinctive characteristics compared to other regions, uniquely characterized as more egalitarian and open. Surabaya is known to have several distinctive arts, namely:

- Ludruk, a cultural drama performance art that tells daily routine of working-class people.
- Remo Dance, a traditional welcome dance is generally dedicated to special guests.
- Kidungan, musical poetry that contains elements of humor.

In addition to the art above, the call culture of arek or rek (a distinctive call from Surabaya) is also a unique characteristic. There are other distinctive calls as well, namely Cak for men and Ning for women. In an effort to preserve culture, Cak & Ning Surabaya is selected once a year, and the selected finalists are tourism ambassadors and icons of the young generation of the city.

Cak Durasim Festival (FCD) is held annually, which is an art festival to preserve the culture of Surabaya and East Java in general. The Cak Durasim Festival is usually held at Cak Durasim Building. There is also the Surabaya Art Festival (FSS) which raises all kinds of art forms such as theatre, dance, music, literary seminars, painting exhibitions. Event organisers usually aside from art groups in Surabaya also come from outside the city. Also enlivened is the screening of movie screens and T-shirt exhibitions. The Surabaya Art Festival is held once a year in June and is usually held at the Youth Hall.

In addition to Javanese culture, there has also been a mixture of various cultures such as from Madura, the Arab world, India, the Malay world, China and Europe. The Surabaya Cross Culture is an annual art and culture festival that show various cultures outside Indonesia.

=== Cuisine ===
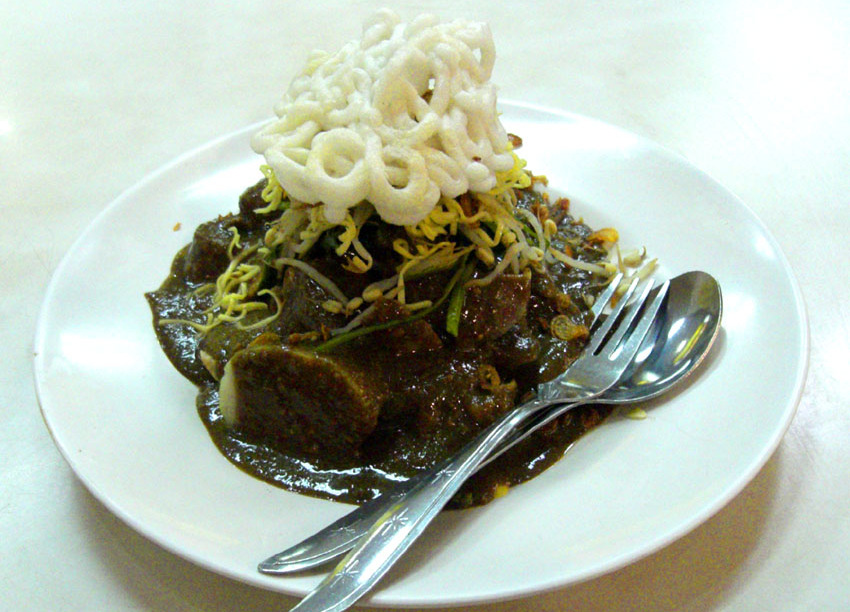
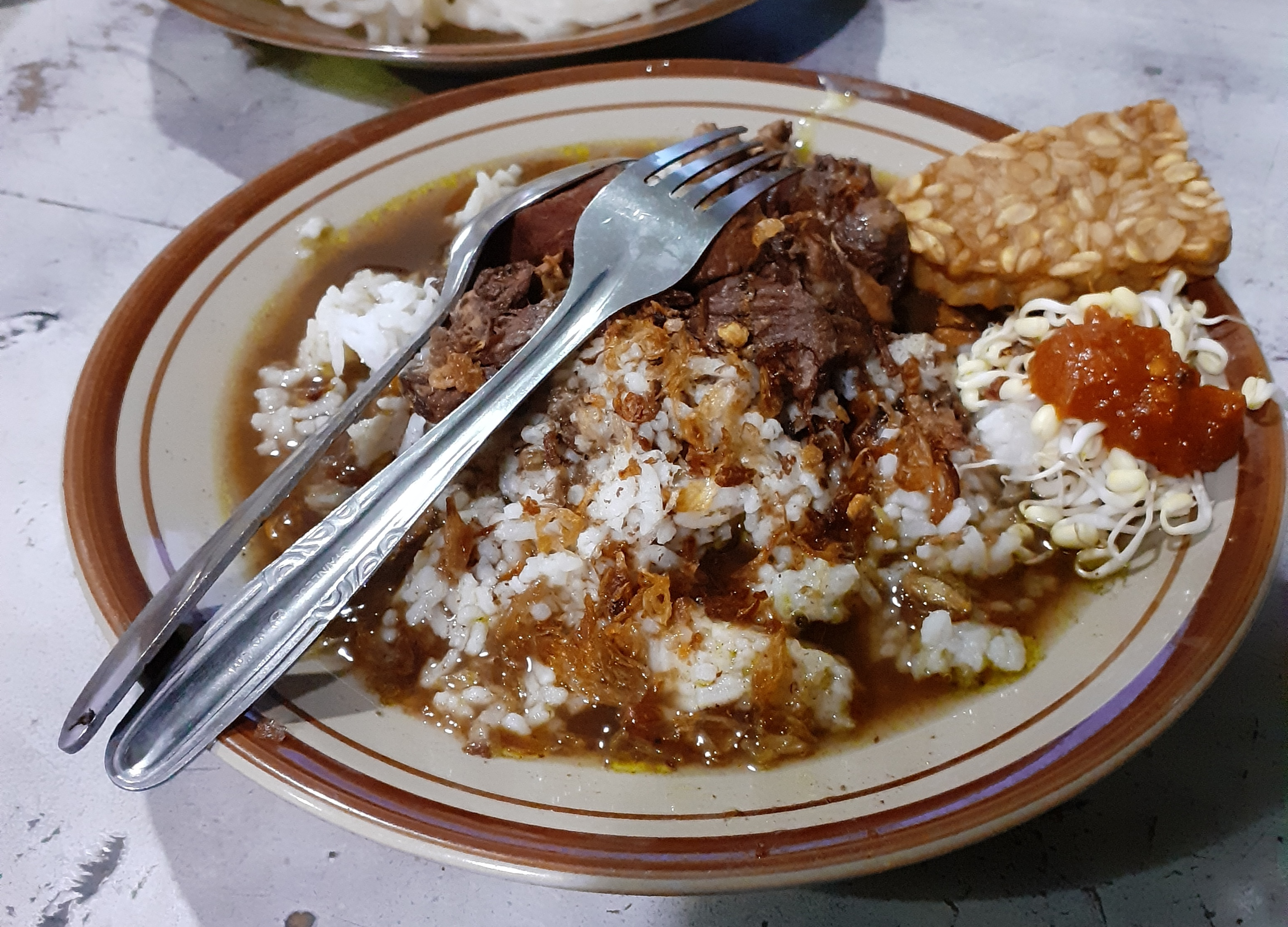
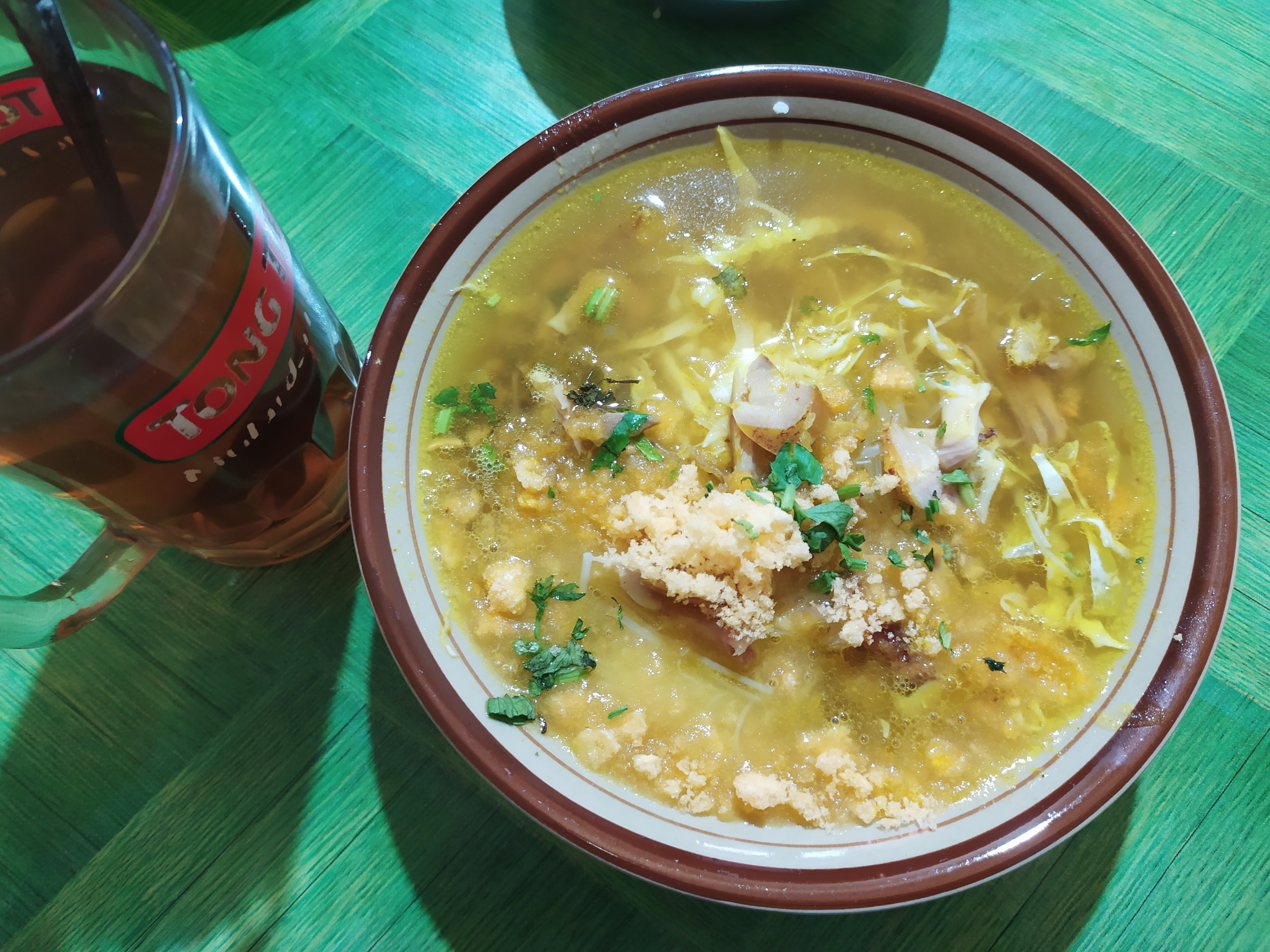
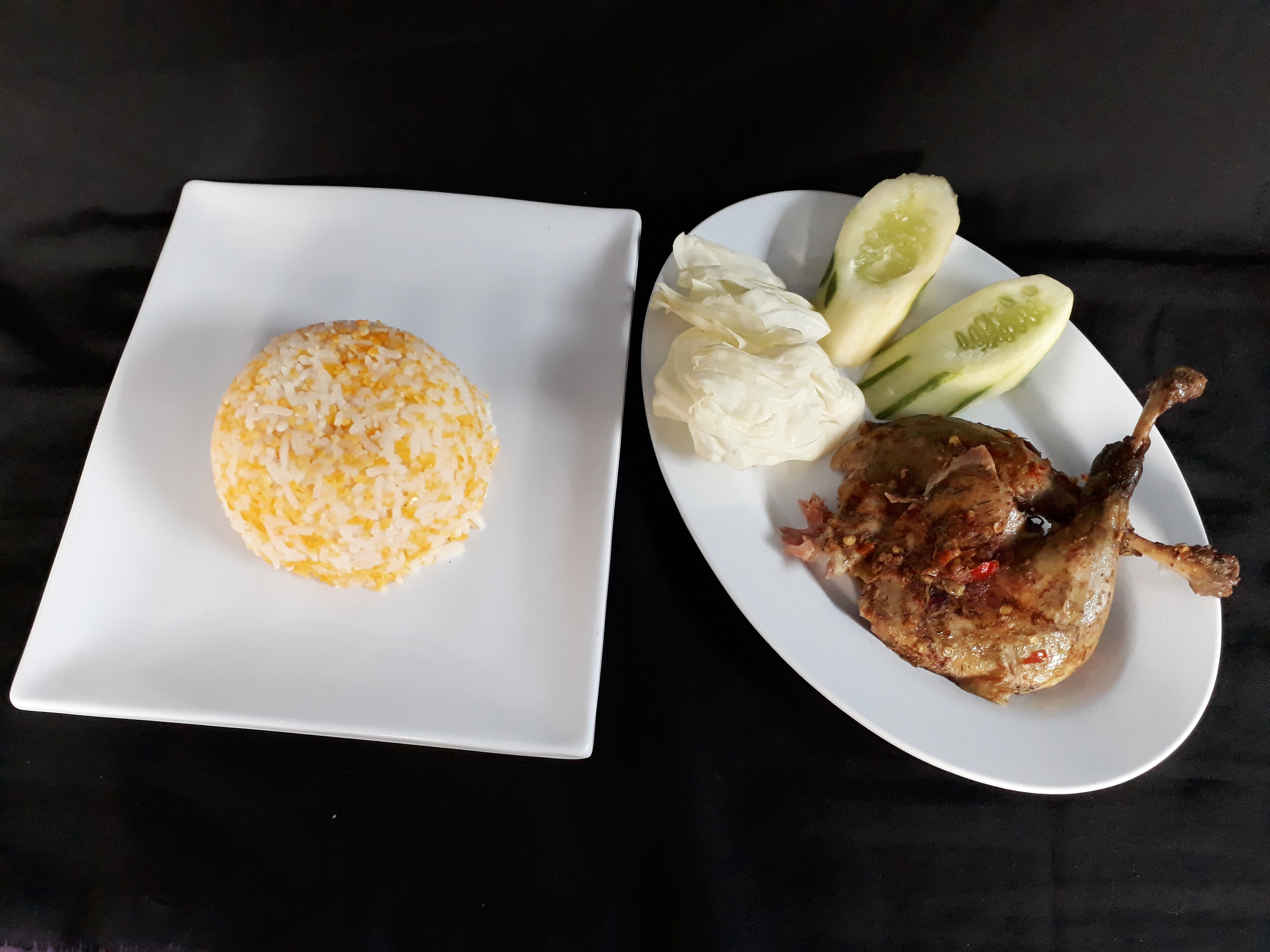
Various Surabayan culinary items, from top left to right: Rujak Cingur, Rawon rice, Soto Lamongan and Bebek Madura

As a metropolitan city, all types of Indonesian cuisine and other international cuisines have a presence. However, as the capital of East Java, cuisines from the rest of the province dominate the culinary culture of the city. East Javanese cuisine includes a variety of processed fruits, crispy tempeh, Bakpao telo, Bakso Malang, Rawon, tahu campur lamongan, Cwie noodles, tahu takwa, tahu pong, getuk pisang, pecel madiun, wingko, tape, nasi krawu, otak-otak bandeng, bonggolan, shrimp crackers, shrimp paste or petis, Tempeh Chips, tahu tepo, Nasi lethok, sego tempong, salad soup, pecel rawon, Suwar-suwir, tape proll, gaplek, lodho, goat satay, and pecel tulungagung.

Surabaya is famous for Rawon, Rujak cingur, Semanggi, Lontong Balap, clams satay, mussels, and rice cake.

- Rujak cingur: a marinated cow snout or lips and noses (cingur), served with boiled vegetables and shrimp crackers. It is then dressed in a sauce made of caramelised fermented shrimp paste (petis), peanuts, chili, and spices. It is usually served with lontong, a boiled rice cake. Rujak cingur is considered traditional food of Surabaya.
- Rawon: a dark beef soup, served with mung bean sprouts and the ubiquitous sambal. The dark (almost black) color comes from the kluwak (Pangium edule) nuts.
- Lontong kupang: lontong with small cockles in petis sauce.
- Semanggi: a salad made of boiled semanggi (Marsilea crenata) leaves that grow in paddy fields. It is dressed in a spicy peanut sauce. It is usually eaten with rice crackers.

=== Sports ===
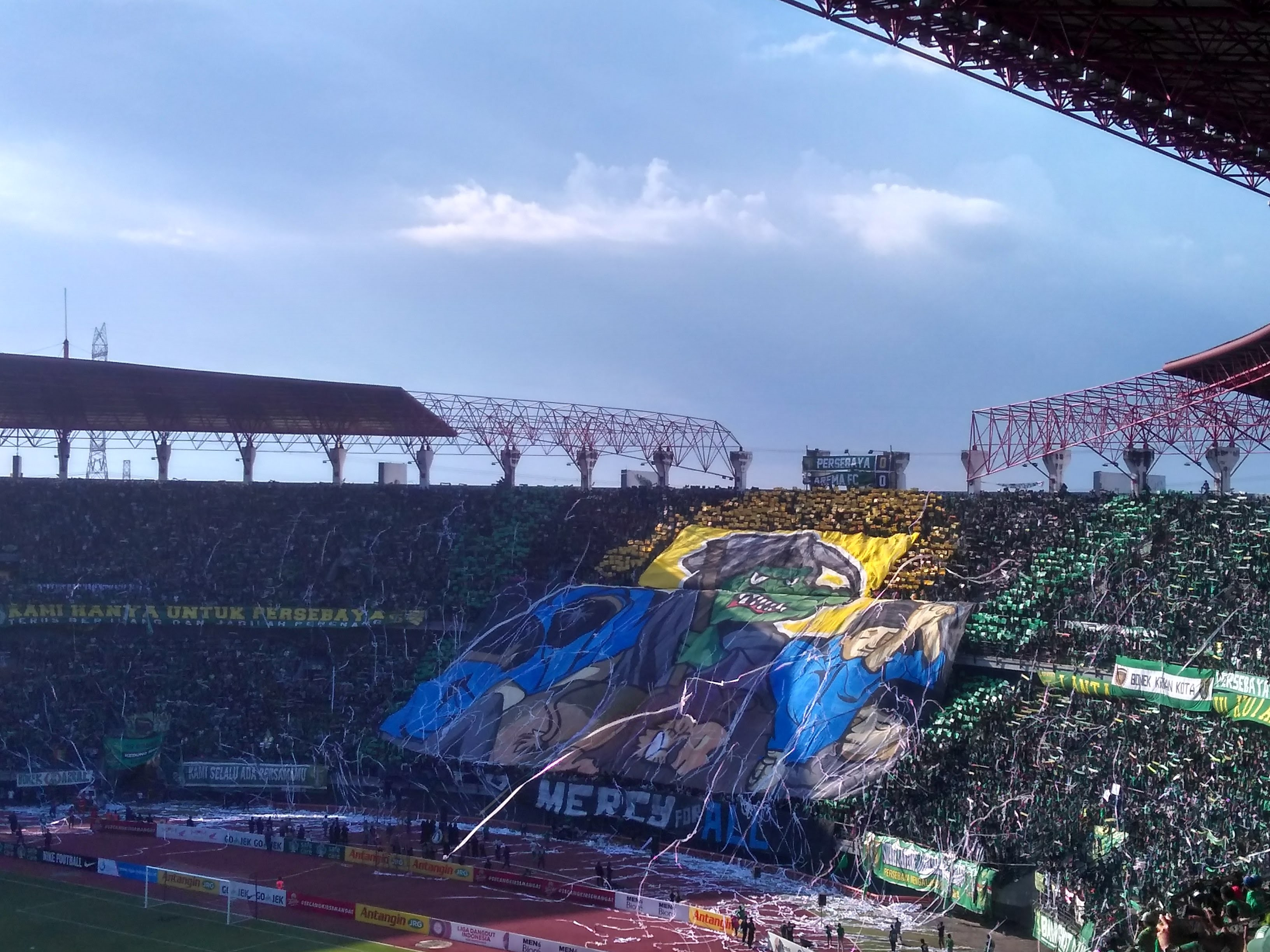
Ultras choreography of Persebaya

Surabaya is a barometer and center of association football development in Indonesia. The city has many association football clubs founded in Surabaya, but Gelora Bung Tomo Stadium is the home of Persebaya Surabaya. The first club was founded by the youth of Hoogere Burger School (HBS) John Edgar with the Victoria club in 1895. Others included Scoren Is Ons Doel (SIOD), Sparta, Rapiditas and Thot Heil Onzer Ribben (THOR). These are the pioneers of association football in Surabaya. The clubs then took management under Oost Java Voetbalbond (OJVB) in 1907. Two years later, the OJVB changed to Soerabajasche Voetbalbond (SVB). Starting in 1914, SVB was based on the Nederlandsch Indische Voetbalbond (NIVB), created by Dutch football federation (KNVB). The Surabaya Chinese and native people also founded their association football clubs by ethnicity. Oei Kwie Liem founded Hoa Soerabaja in 1914, while the Bumiputera through R Pamoedji and Paidjo founded the Soerabajasche Indonesische Voetbalbond (SIVB) on 18 June 1927 (now Persebaya), which three years later co-founded the PSSI.

In 1950, the working-class people and office men founded Soerabajasche Kantoor Voetbalbond (SKVB). The association football sector in Indonesia and specifically Surabaya became more developed, and the football association of Indonesia founded a semi-professional competition in 1979, which was named the Main Football League (Galatama). A new team emerged from Surabaya, NIAC Partners and the Salim Group Association. Besides Galatama, PSSI also formed a women's soccer competition called the Women's Football League (Galanita). Surabaya also has a women's soccer team, which was founded in 1977 and named Puteri Puspita. Clubs from Surabaya have also gained attention from the rest of the world. Persebaya has competed against European teams including Lokomotiv Moscow, Sturm Graz, Grasshoppers, Salzburg, Stade de Reims, Ajax Amsterdam, PSV Eindhoven, AC Milan, and lastly, Queens Park Rangers (QPR). Aside from European teams, there are several national teams outside the country competing against Persebaya, including Yugoslavia Olympics, Malaysia, Mozambique, Uruguay, Thailand, South Korea, and the Japanese national team.

NIAC Mitra also competed against Arsenal and won the Aga Khan Gold Cup competition in 1979 in Bangladesh. The achievements of NIAC Mitra in the Galatama competition included three championships in 1980–1982, 1982–1983, and 1987–1988, and finishing as runners-up in 1988–89. However, NIAC Partners officially dissolved and withdrew from the Galatama competition held by PSSI in 1990 because they considered the policies issued by PSSI irrelevant. After being disbanded, the demands of the Surabaya community to revive the NIAC Partners were channelled when the Jawa Pos party weighed in and changed the name of the NIAC Partner to the Surabaya Partner. When the Union competition was merged with Galatama in 1994, the new Persebaya was able to win in 1997 and 2004. Persebaya was listed as the first team capable of winning the Indonesian League twice. Mitra Surabaya was only able to exist until the 1998–1999 season and it was re-established again in another city, Tenggarong and has not used the name of Surabaya again.

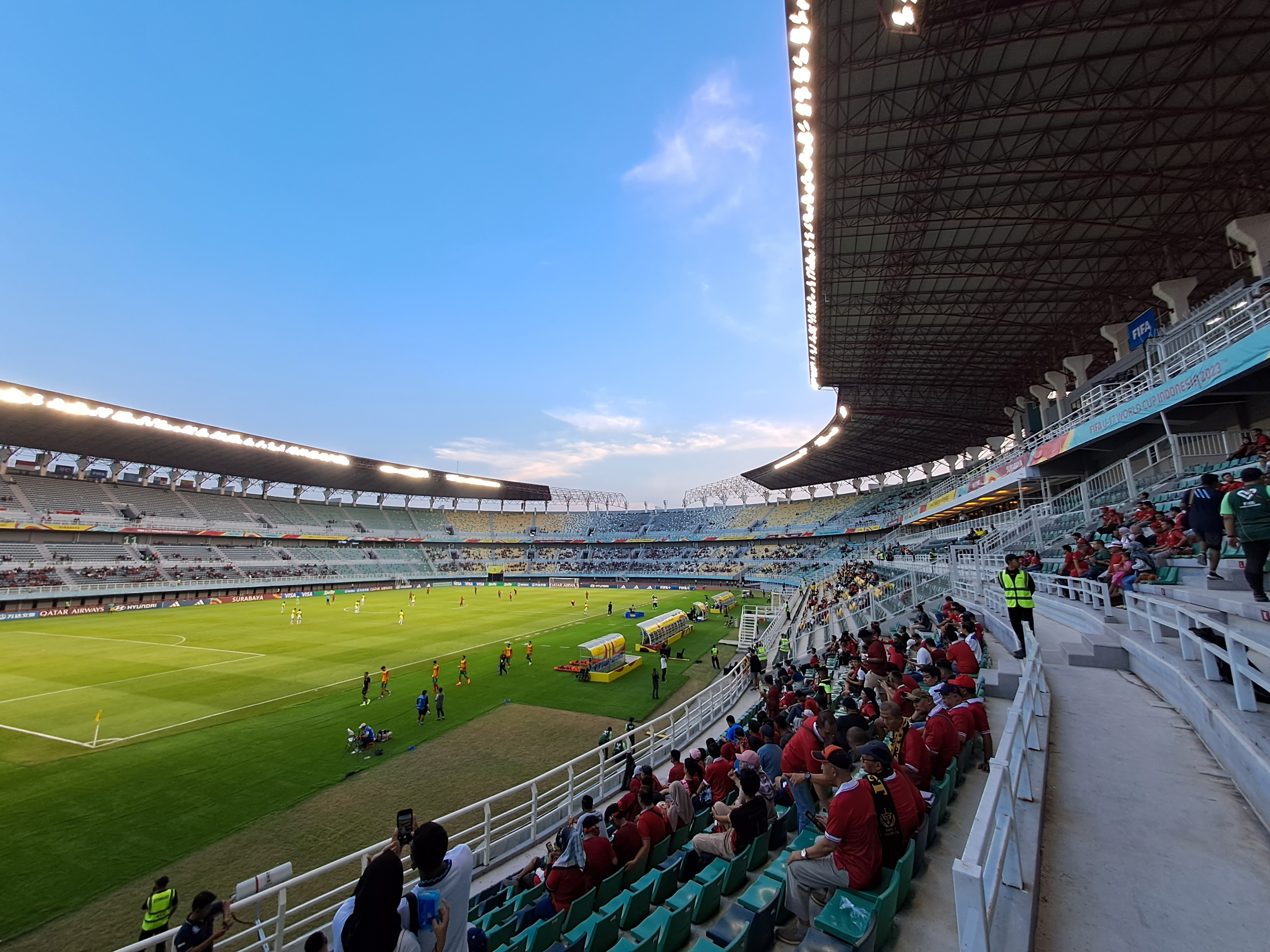
Inside Gelora Bung Tomo Stadium in 2023

Recently, only Persebaya has stable fans and achievements. Persebaya has won the Indonesian Premier Division three times–twice when the division was the first tier and once as the second tier. Fans refer to themselves as Bonek, an abbreviation for Bondo Nekat (which translates as "equipped by bravery"). The city is the home of CLS Knights Indonesia, a basketball club which participated in IBL (Indonesia basketball league) & Asean Basketball League.

Surabaya has a multi-purpose stadium, Gelora Bung Tomo Stadium. The stadium is used mostly for football matches. It is the new home stadium of Persebaya, replacing Gelora 10 November Stadium. It was the venue of a match between Persebaya 1927 against then–English Premier League club Queens Park Rangers, held on 23 July 2012.

Another prevalent sport is badminton. There are numerous schools and clubs in the city that train students of various ages to reach the next level of the Badminton League. Many children start out their career from Surabaya and have made it to the national and sometimes international level.

=== Media ===
One of the largest circulating national newspapers in Indonesia, Jawa Pos, is headquartered in Surabaya; alongside its media conglomerate Jawa Pos Group. Major newspapers include Surabaya Pagi and Surya.

Surabaya is served by many radio and television networks. Radio networks affiliates include the public RRI Surabaya, Gen FM Surabaya 103.1 and Prambors FM Surabaya 89.3; as well as local stations Suara Surabaya 100.0, EBS FM and Radio Merdeka 106.7. Local television stations include JTV (both are regional stations serving East Java, which are based in the city), Jawa Pos TV, Surabaya TV and Nahdlatul Ulama-affiliated TV9.

== Education ==
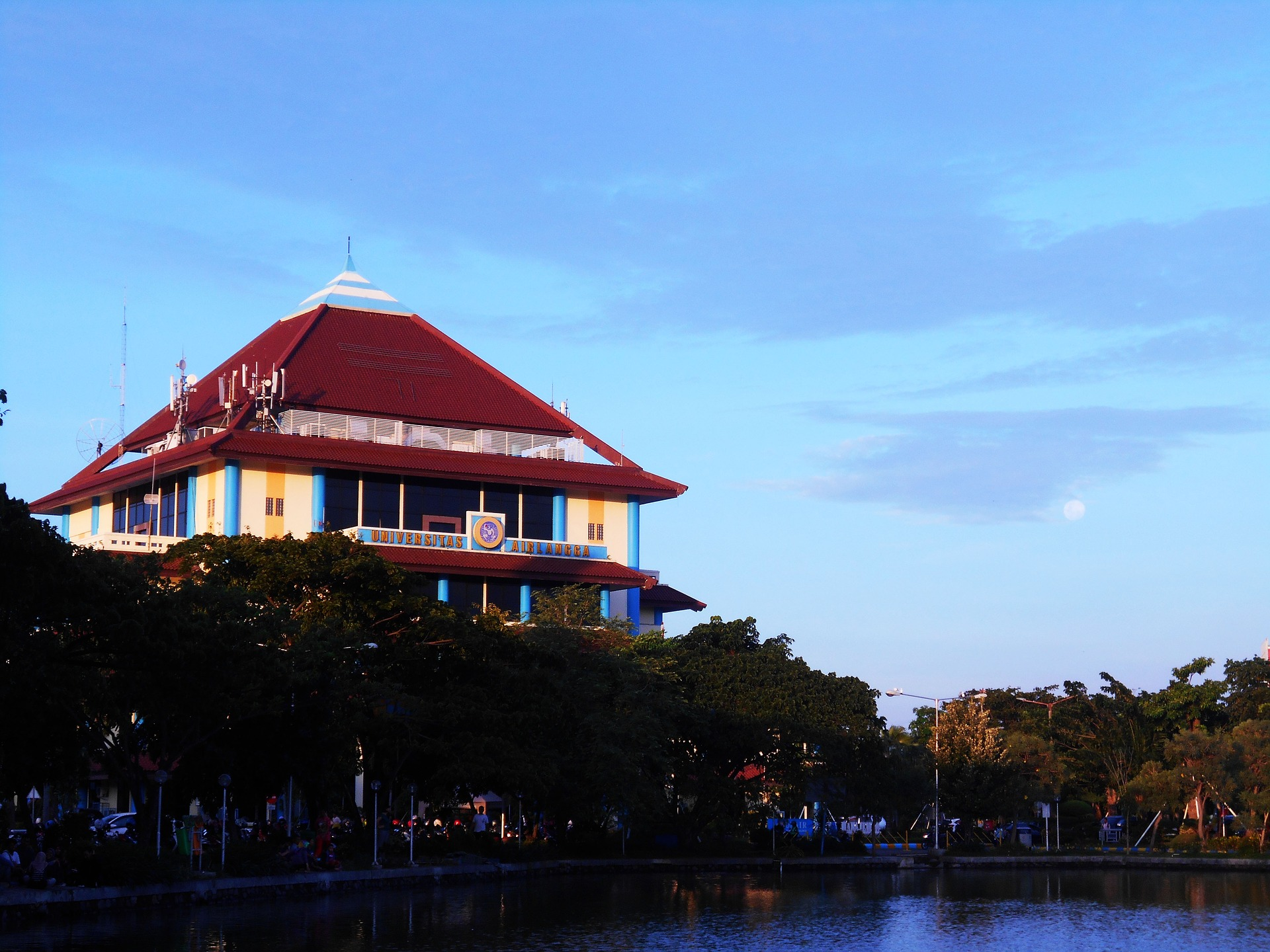
Airlangga University (UNAIR) rectorate building

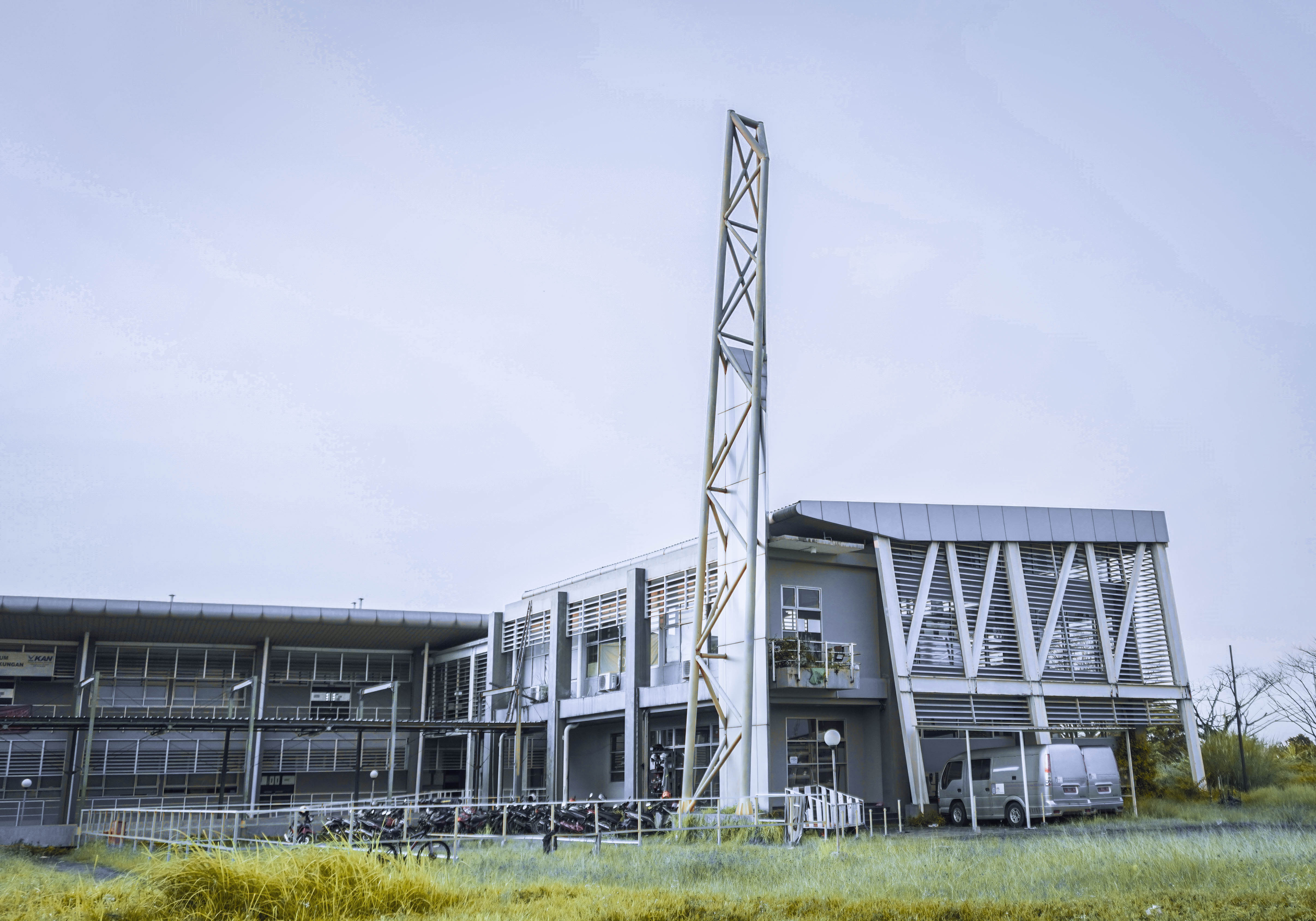
ITS Robotics Center at Sepuluh Nopember Institute of Technology (ITS)

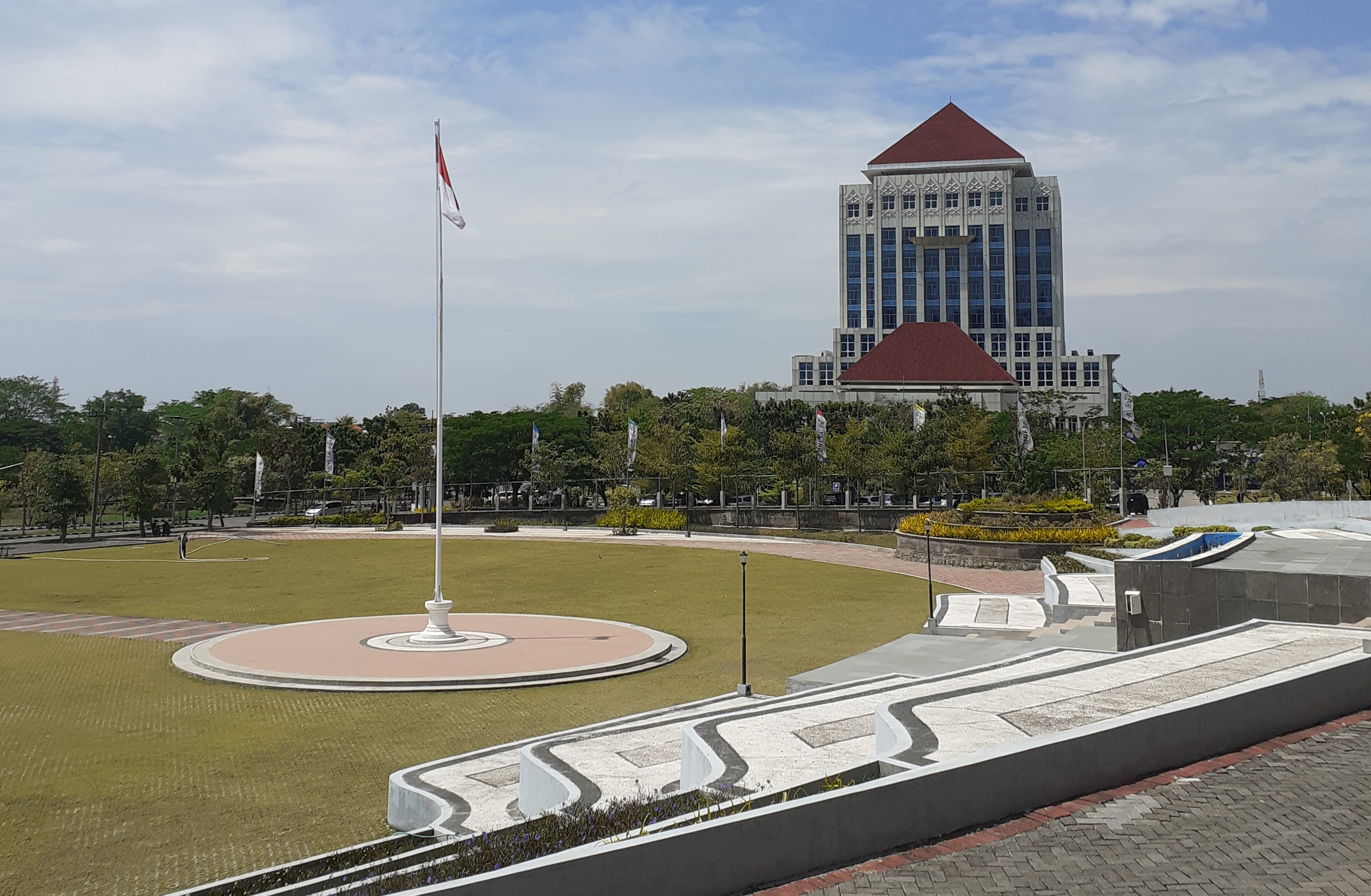
Postgraduate building of State University of Surabaya (UNESA)

One of the most well-liked educational locations in Indonesia is Surabaya, which is home to about 40 higher education institutions. In addition to various state-funded and -managed Junior High Schools (SMP Negeri), State High Schools (SMA Negeri), and State Vocational Schools (SMK), there are hundreds of public and private schools in the city. The city is home to at least seventeen universities, six of which are owned by the state, and sixty-four professional schools. These universities provide everything from natural, technology, and social sciences to tourism instruction.

Major universities and institutes can be found in Surabaya. Public universities in the city includes Universitas Airlangga (UNAIR), Sepuluh Nopember Institute of Technology (ITS), Electronic Engineering Polytechnic Institute of Surabaya (PENS) and Surabaya Shipbuilding State Polytechnic (PPNS) and State University of Surabaya (UNESA).

Several religious institutions are also located in Surabaya, including Petra Christian University, Sunan Ampel State Islamic University, and Widya Mandala Catholic University. Private institutions in the city include University of Surabaya, Wijaya Putra University, Bhayangkara University, Ciputra University and Hang Tuah University. Surabaya also houses Western Sydney University's Indonesia Campus.

Additionally, there are several international schools here, which is Surabaya Intercultural School, Surabaya Japanese School (スラバヤ日本人学校), Surabaya Taipei International School (印尼泗水臺灣學校), Surabaya European School, Merlion School, Ciputra School, and Spins Interactional School.

== International relations ==
Surabaya has cooperation between cities throughout the world as well as several state representative offices here, such as the General Consulates and Consulates, considering that this city is ranked second in terms of population and economy. And some of this list are overseas representative offices and city twin towns such are:

=== Diplomatic Missions ===
==== General Consulates ====
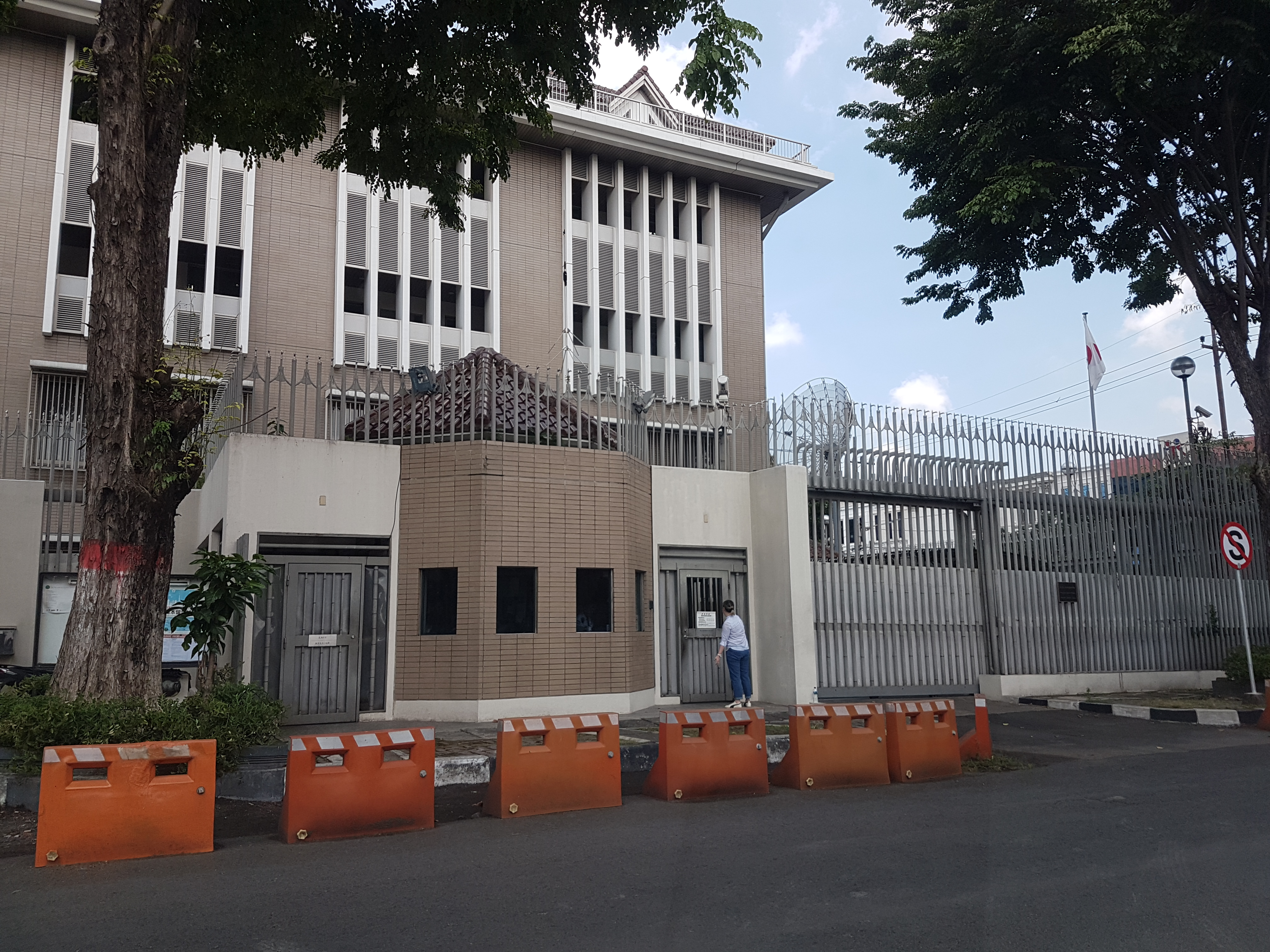
Consulate-General of Japan in Surabaya

- Australian Consulate-General, Surabaya
- Chinese Consulate-General, Surabaya
- Consulate-General of Japan, Surabaya
- Consulate General of the United States, Surabaya

==== Consulates ====
- Austria
- Belarus
- Belgium
- Croatia
- Czech Republic
- Denmark
- East Timor
- Finland
- France
- Germany
- Hungary
- India
- Mongolia
- Netherlands
- New Zealand
- Philippines
- Poland
- Russia
- Slovakia
- Sri Lanka
- Switzerland
- Sri Lanka
- Sweden
- Thailand
- United Kingdom

==== Other diplomatic offices ====
- Taiwan (Taipei Economic and Trade Office in Surabaya)

=== Twin towns – sister cities ===
Surabaya is twinned with:

- Seattle, United States (1992)
- Busan, South Korea (1994)
- Kōchi, Japan (1997)
- Monterrey, Mexico (2001)
- Guangzhou, China (2005)
- Xiamen, China (2008)
- Varna, Bulgaria (2010)
- Liverpool, England (2017)
- New Delhi, India (2021)
- Shah Alam, Malaysia
- Kaoshiung, Taiwan
- Alexandria, Egypt
- Johor Bahru, Malaysia
- Kuala Belait, Brunei

Surabaya also has a friendship agreement with:

- Fremantle, Australia (1996)

== See also ==
- Colonial architecture of Surabaya
- List of tallest buildings in Surabaya
- Surabaya metropolitan area
