= Gloria 1 Christian High School Surabaya =

Private school in Surabaya, East Java, Indonesia

Gloria 1 Christian High School
- Sekolah Menengah Atas Kristen Gloria 1

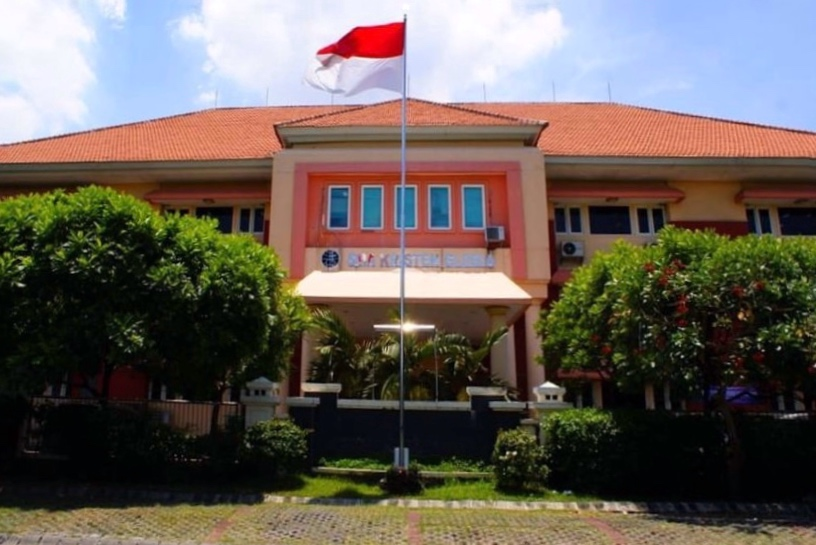
- The old school building photographed before refurbishment

Location
- Jl. Raya Sukomanunggal Jaya No. 25 A Surabaya, Indonesia, 60188
- Coordinates: 7.2704°S 112.6949°E

Information
- Type: Private Christian high school
- Motto: Gloria for Christ
- Religious affiliations: Calvinism, Methodism
- Established: 1996
- Local authority: Surabaya
- Principal: Kim Ruthie
- Gender: Co-educational
- Age range: 15–18
- Enrollment: 407 (2023–24)
- Student to teacher ratio: 10.17 (2023–24)
- Colours: Blue and White
- Song: Mars Gloria
- Team name: Bluestars
- Affiliation: ACSI; Cambridge International; MPK Indonesia
- Alumni: Alumni Gloria
- Website: www.gloriaschool.org/en/

Gloria 1 Christian High School (Indonesian: Sekolah Menengah Atas Kristen Gloria 1), popularly known simply as Gloria 1, is a private Christian high school in Surabaya, Indonesia. It was founded in 1996 by the Gloria Christian Education Foundation (YPK Gloria) under the name Gloria Christian School, where it reorganised itself under its current name in 2002. The school is considered one of the most favoured in the city.

== History ==
=== Gloria Pacar (1984–present) ===
Gloria Christian School began with an awareness of the need for Christian services in the field of education, which resulted in a formal educational institution being established by the Abdiel Christian Church, a Hoklo concentrated branch of Christianity in Surabaya.

In 1984, the first school was opened at GKA Gloria building on Jl. Pacar (Pacar St), with a total of 36 students for kindergarten and elementary school, as well as 9 teaching staff. Early school activities were held on spaces provided by the church.

=== Gloria Christian School (1996–present) ===
On July 17, 1996, Gloria Christian School was opened in West Surabaya, precisely at Jalan Kupang Indah (Kupang Indah St), taking in the space previously held by Surabaya International School. The Gloria Family Day event was marked by this event.

The school offered education from kindergarten (TK-KB) to secondary (SMA). Each year, classes continued to grow until the entire building becomes incapacitated, which prompt the Foundation to relocate its high school to another location, separate from Gloria's main campus, and thus, detaching itself (albeit still within the same governance) from Gloria Christian School and becomes Gloria Christian High School.

=== Gloria 1 Christian High School (2002–present) ===
In 2002, learning activities for high school were officially moved to a new building on Jalan Raya Sukomanunggal Jaya (Sukomanunggal Jaya St).

Gloria Christian School expanded its high school system to Eastern Surabaya in 2008, at the Pakuwon City residential complex, which precipitated Gloria Christian High School to be renamed as Gloria 1 Christian High School, while the latter is named Gloria 2 Christian High School.

== Governance ==
The school is directly governed by the Gloria Christian Education Foundation, an organisation under the auspicious of the Abdiel Christian Church, whom oversees 3 other day school and 1 international school in Surabaya. The day-to-day management of the school is executed by the executive board, which members are appointed by the foundation.

The executive board appoints the school principal, who has the responsibility to execute the school's day-to-day operation. The principal usually deputised his power to 3 other senior role within the school, namely: deputy principal for student's affairs (also known as the dean of students) (Wakil Kepala Sekolah bagian Kesiswaan), deputy principal for finance and procurement (Wakil Kepala Sekolah bagian Sarana dan Prasarana), as well as deputy principal for academic affairs and the curriculum (Wakil Kepala Sekolah bagian Kurikulum)

The current principal is Kim Ruthie, who took office in 2023 in succession to Kennedy Yuandy.

== Student life and facilities ==
Over in its year of existence, the school has developed an extensive facilities to cater the needs of its students. The school has its own hall, which are used by its students every Tuesday (year 10), Wednesday (year 11) and Friday (year 12) for weekly church services. Students are also obliged to attend a school ceremony every Monday, an event where the school principal and deputy principal often make speeches about school agendas for the week, which are organised by its Student Council.

Gloria 1 has a distinguishable and strict school uniform policy that are compulsory to be worn. The uniform consists of a blue button-down shirt with the school crest on the chest, and dark blue pants for boys', while girls uniform consist of a pleated and blue tartan skirt or jumper dress, and a blue button-down shirt. A necktie is not to be worn on a regular basis, yet required when attending the school ceremony.

As a day school, students of Gloria 1 do not board, and return to their home after school days. Students are required to be at school 7:30 each morning and do their daily devotion. At 8:00 am, students will then attend their classes according to their major and schedule. Gloria 1 operates a moving class system, where students themselves are the ones who move in-between classes, as opposed to the teachers. Each classes last 45 minutes, and its students are given a 5-minute grace period to enter the next class from the previous, after which a disciplinary action would be taken. If the classes are located at the far end of the school or if the previous class were PE, in which students would be required to change from their school sportswear to the school uniform, a 10–15 minutes grace period would usually apply. Students finishes school at 15:25, yet most of them stayed longer (until at least 17:00 or even 21:00 for basketball) as the school obliged its year 10 and year 11 students to take at least one extracurricular. Gloria 1 school length is 5 days a week, yet in some circumstances, students are required to attend school at a Saturday to do their extracurricular, or practice sports.

The school hosts both an indoor and outdoor sports hall, as well as 4 laboratory, each for physics, biology, chemistry, and computing. The school also has an auditorium, used for English listening classes, a recording studio for members of the school band, gym, common room for the students' council sabbatical officers, students counselling room, school health unit, library, and a student dining room.

Unlike any other school in Indonesia, students of Gloria 1 dine-in together with their teachers in the school's dining room. Both students and teachers may choose a dish and a dessert from 3 designated points, often serving different styles of cuisine (e.g. Chinese, Western, Japanese, Indonesian, etc.). Students meal are included in the annual tuition and operation fees.

In terms of academics, prospective students are required to designate their desired major for their time in school. There are 2 streams available: Mathematics and Natural Sciences as well as Social Sciences and Humanities. Mathematics and Natural Sciences student (collectively known as MIPA Students) are required to study and take further mathematics, biology, physics and chemistry for their National Exam, whereas Social Sciences student (collectively known as IPS Students) are required to study and take advanced history, economy, geography, and sociology.

The school also emphasises the use of English and Chinese in its education, with an increased competency in English (additional 6–7 hours/week) and basic Mandarin (additional 4 hours/week) from the standard curriculum. The school also obliged its students to take the HSK Chinese Proficiency Test with a minimum entrance of Level 3 or B1 in CEFR. More recently, recognising its students increasing international output, the school has also introduced a mandatory IELTS examination that would be taken on year 12.

=== Sports ===
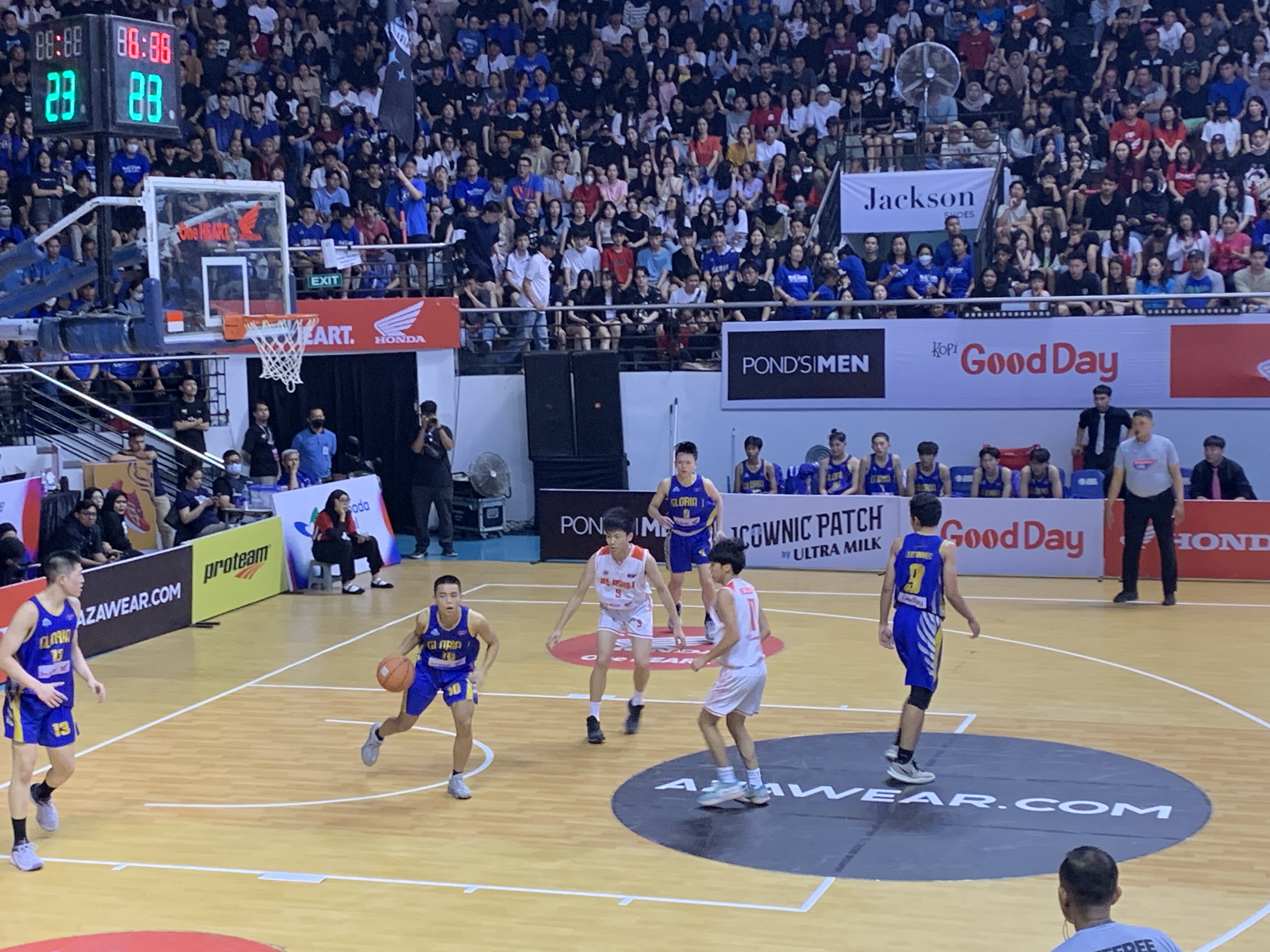
DBL East Java Championship where Gloria 1 (blue) fought against St. Louis School (white), the two school has shared many years of rivalries in sports and education.

Gloria 1 is particularly well known for its elitism in sports, particularly basketball, with the school investing heavily on the matter. Its team, nicknamed Bluestars, has 5 titles (2011, 2019, 2021, 2022, and 2023) in the Development Basketball League championship.

For many years, the school has had an extensive rivalry with St. Louis School, where it (almost always) meet the team in finals within the league. It is also a very well known fact that the Girls Team of Gloria 1 will (almost always) win the league, while the reverse is true. Gloria 1 invest heavily in finding pupils with incredible sporting talent, often offering 100% scholarship for people all over Indonesia. Its alumni has often went on a scholarship for their exceptional talent in sports, and some have even went to the United States to train under the league's flagship program – the DBL Camp.

Training to be on the school team are said to be "exhausting", and may add up to an additional 7 hours in school, or even 10 hours if it is near the tournament's date. The school forbids failing (albeit talented sportsperson) students to be recruited on the team. The school obliged all team members to still be on their best academic excellence while pursuing their hobbies.

Outside of basketball, the school also provides extensive training for futsal, table tennis, badminton and chess. The school also host the annual Gloria Cup, where schools from all over Surabaya compete with one another in a variety of sports.

=== Societies ===
Like many other school in Indonesia, Gloria 1 recognised the presence of OSIS (Student Council) within its jurisdiction. The Student Council are branded as the United Student Council, which are sub-divided into 4 departments – Department of Nationality, Department of Creativity, Department of Public Relations, and the Department of Publication & Documentation. The United Student Council is usually made up of 20 students, with extras being recruited later on following the academic year. The student council organises the weekly school ceremony, the students media, student elections, the yearly national day parade, and many other events monthly. Also unique to the student council of Gloria 1, is that its Religious Affairs Department are not dependent on the United Student Council, in other words, independent, with its own head, members, budget, and chaplain. That department is styled as the Service Committee, which organises the weekly school services and other major Christian celebration, such as Christmas and Easter.

To run as a sabbatical officer, students are required to fill out a registration form and attend an interview with the outgoing officers. After which, if successful, candidates are contacted and required to attend the Basic Student Leadership Training, known as LDKS, where they will live in school for 2–3 nights to be trained and assessed in leadership. Once a president is elected (usually November), he/she would be invited by the school to form a student government, and the president has all rights to choose his council members within the scope of the participant of the LDKS, usually with the advice of the outgoing president.

The school also has many societies that caters for many different hobbies. This includes: Volleyball, Badminton, Table tennis, Futsal, Photography, Videography, Environment, Bands, Arts & Crafts, Book Club, Culinary art, Computer Programming, Choir, Classical Guitar, Cheerleading, Cooking Class, Fashion Design, Sewing, Robotics and Basketball.

=== Boys' Brigade ===
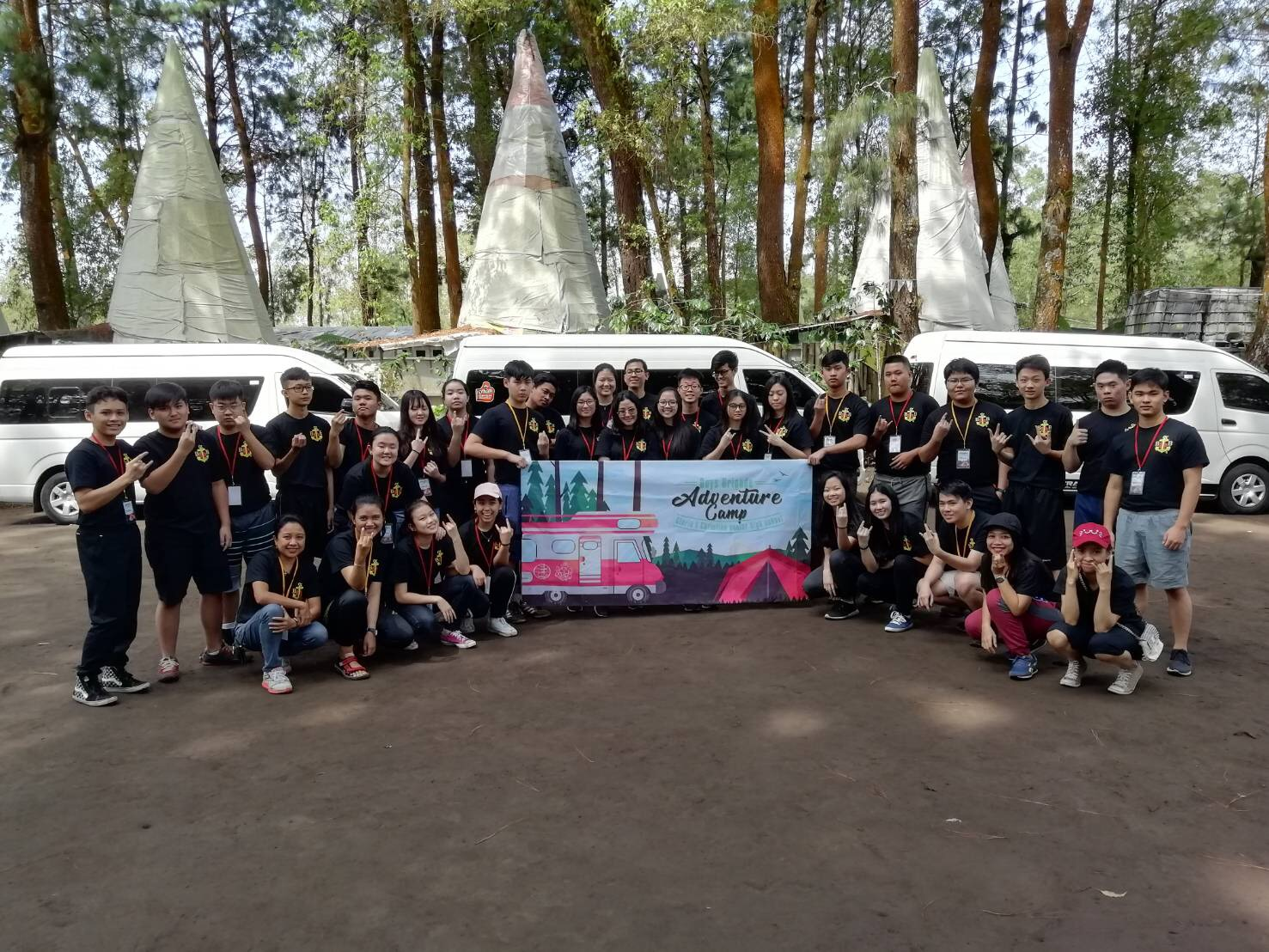
Gloria 1 students expedition to Coban Talun, Malang, as part of the Boys' Brigade

Pupils of the school in their first and second year are required to serve in the school's Boys' Brigade, a British-based Christian uniformed youth organisation.

In the broader sense, the organisation first came to Indonesia through the Boys' Brigade in Singapore. Within the school itself however, the uniformed group was founded in 2004 as the Boys' Brigade 7th Surabaya Company, where it operated in a limited, and often, voluntary capacity. In 2010, the school made it mandatory for its students to serve within the cadet to train their leadership, obedience and strength. Members of the Boys' Brigade will earn badges for every modules and tests they have taken, this includes target badge (compulsory), Christian education (compulsory), camping, drill, gymnastic, community service, first aid, hobbies, swimming, expedition, pipers, etc.; which will be displayed in their badge sleeve.

Older and senior Boys' are allowed (if nominated by the company) to gain promotion into a Non-Commissioned Officer (NCO), where they will be trained and assessed in the Leadership Development Camp for 3 days, often with hardships involved. Supposed a member pass the assessment, they will be promoted into a Lance-Corporal and have the right to wore chevrons on their upper left and right arms, as well as displaying the "NCO Star" in their badge sleeves. NCO serves as the first point of contact if officers are not on duty, and often held leadership position within the Brigade's parade and (to a certain extent) within the school system itself.

== Reputation and achievements ==
Gloria 1 is accredited A (distinguished) by the National Accreditation Board. The school is quite selective of its prospective students, and requires the completion of an admission test (exceptions made for students with outstanding sports and creative arts ability and/or internal student previously studying within the Gloria School System), which assesses the applicant's Indonesian, English and mathematics ability, before any offer could be made.

Students of Gloria 1 excel both in academics and leadership. Internationally, its student have created a digital auxanometer, which won a bronze medal in the International Conference of Young Scientists.

In STEM, its students have won over a dozen of gold, silver and bronze medal in the Indonesian Science, Mathematics and Business Olympiad. In linguistic, many of its students have also won gold and bronze awards. Gloria 1 student have also represented the province (East Java) in the national science competition.

In sports, the school has held 5 titles (2011, 2019, 2021, 2022, and 2023) in the Development Basketball League

During the COVID-19 pandemic, its teachers published a research on the management of medical mask waste in schools, which received 3rd place in the Teacher's Publication Development, held by Petra Christian University.

== Former pupils ==
Former students of Gloria 1 are known as alumni Gloria or alumnus Gloria. Most (if not all) of its pupils continue their further education, often enrolling into prestigious universities in Indonesia and abroad. Domestically, students who stayed in Surabaya often went to the Petra Christian University, Airlangga University and the University of Surabaya; and those who left often go to the Pelita Harapan University, BINUS University, and the University of Indonesia.

Internationally, former pupils have gone on to Purdue University, University of Maryland, National University of Singapore (NUS) , Nanyang Technological University (NTU), Queen's University Belfast, University of Manchester, University of Melbourne, University of New South Wales (UNSW), Technical University of Munich, Zhejiang University, etc.
