= Vision+ =

Indonesian video on demand service

PT MNC OTT Network
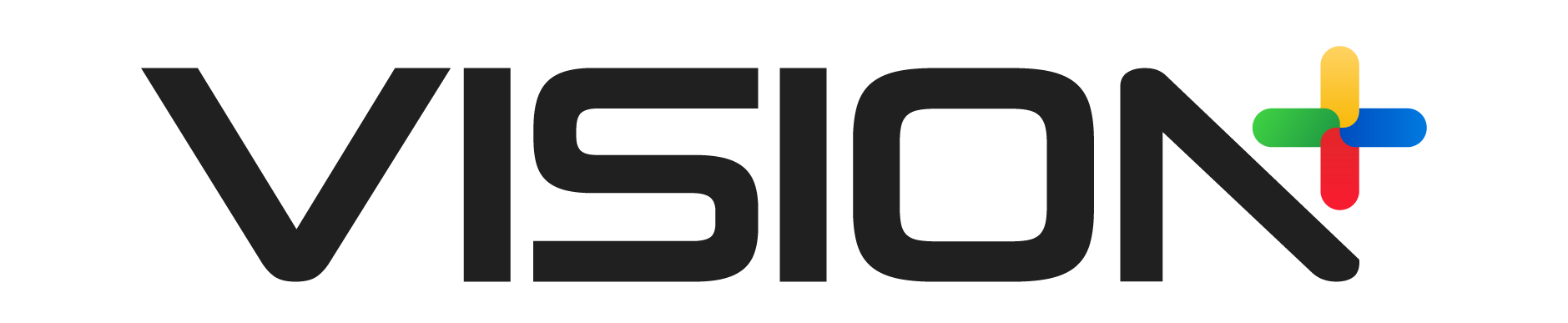
- Company type: Subsidiary PT
- Website type: OTT platform Video hosting service
- Available in: Indonesian; English
- Headquarters: MNC Tower, Jl. Kebon Sirih No. 26, Menteng, Central Jakarta, Indonesia
- Country of origin: Indonesia
- Area served: Indonesia; Malaysia
- Owner: Media Nusantara Citra
- President: Hary Tanoesoedibjo
- Key people: Hary Tanoesoedibjo; Liliana Tanoesoedibjo; Clarissa Tanoesoedibjo
- Website: www.visionplus.id
- Launched: 15 January 2020; 6 years ago
- Current status: Active

Vision+ is an Indonesian over-the-top video streaming service owned by MNC Group. Established on 15 January 2020, Vision+ service's content consists of video on demand contents (original titles, TV dramas and shows, films), free-to-air and premium channels (including international channels) and livestreaming events & sports.

== History ==
Vision+ launched on January 15, 2020. Vision+ was previously known as Indovision Anywhere from June 6, 2014, to August 18, 2016, Moviebay from August 19, 2016, to August 18, 2018, and MNC Now from August 19, 2018, to January 14, 2020.

On August 19, 2018, eight months after the merger of the brands Indovision, OkeVision, and Top TV into MNC Vision and the rebranding of the MNC Play logo, MNC Now was launched as part of a synergy under MVN (MNC Vision Networks) to replace the name Moviebay.

MNC Now offered a "second screen" for MNC Vision and MNC Play subscribers, allowing them to watch their subscription packages on mobile devices. However, with updates to its target market and content, MNC Now introduced a new name and look as Vision+ on January 15, 2020.

== Content ==
Vision+ Originals refers to programs exclusively released to Vision+.

Year	Title	Date release
2020	Twisted 1	10 October 2020
2020	Dua Alam 1	10 October 2020
2020	Ketawa Dimana Aja	11 November 2020
2020	MVP	12 December 2020
2021	Skripsick	1 January 2021
2021	Disconnected	1 January 2021
2021	Sumber Rezeki The Series	3 March 2021
2021	The Intern	4 April 2021
2021	The Waves	5 May 2021
2021	Kepengen Hijrah	5 May 2021
2021	Beyond Creators	6 June 2021
2021	Dunia Maya	7 July 2021
2021	Joe & Robot Kopi	7 July 2021
2021	Daur Hidup	9 September 2021
2021	Twisted 2	10 October 2021
2021	Once Upon a Time in Chinatown	10 October 2021
2021	Dua Alam 2	10 October 2021
2021	Cantik ya Kamu	11 November 2021
2021	Lukas	12 December 2021
2022	Creepy Valentine	2 February 2022
2022	Jack dan Danil	2 February 2022
2022	Katanya	3 March 2022
2022	Have a Nice Date	4 April 2022
2022	Menemukanmu	4 April 2022
2022	Orkes Semesta	5 May 2022
2022	Angel	6 June 2022
2022	Cinta di Balik Awan	7 July 2022
2022	Bad Parenting	27 July 2022
2022	Royal Blood	17 August 2022
2022	Menggapai Ikatan Cinta	9 September 2022
2022	12 Hari	10 October 2022
2022	Melody of Love	10 October 2022
2022	My Comic Boyfriend	11 November 2022
2022	Piknik Pesona	27 November 2022
2022	Catatan Akhir Sekolah	5 December 2022
2022	Kejarlah Daku Kau Kutangkap	19 December 2022
2022	Jujur	23 December 2022
2023	Cidro Asmoro	20 January 2023
2023	Roy & Marten	17 February 2023
2023	Arab Maklum	25 March 2023
2023	Iiihhh Serem	26 May 2023
2023	Candy Caddy	23 June 2023
2023	TLC: TV Love Cinema	21 July 2023
2023	Cinlock	10 August 2023
2023	Temen Ngekost	8 September 2023
2023	Radio	13 October 2023
2023	Twisted 3: The Sinners	24 October 2023
2023	Montir Cantik	8 December 2023
