= Edward Tannur =

Indonesian politician (born 1961)

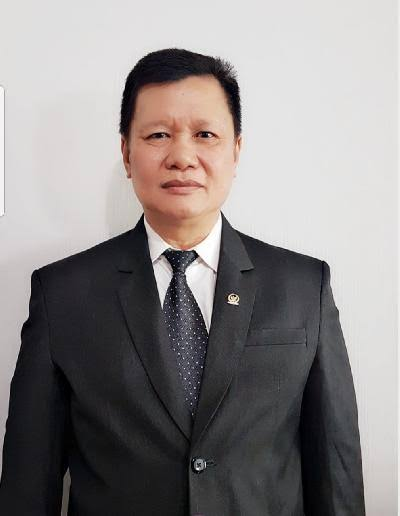

Member of the House of Representatives of Indonesia
- In office 1 October 2009 – 1 October 2024
- Constituency: Nusa Tenggara Timur II

Personal details
- Born: December 2, 1961 (age 64) Atambua, Nusa Tenggara Timur, Indonesia
- Party: PKB
- Spouse: Meirizka Widjaja
- Children: 3, including Ronald Tannur
- Education: Universitas PGRI Kupang
- Occupation: Businessperson, Politician

Edward Tannur (born 2 December 1961) is an Indonesian politician and businessman who was elected into the House of Representatives of Indonesia for the three consecutive terms in 2009–2024. A non-active cadre of the National Awakening Party, he represented the East Nusa Tenggara II electoral district and sat in Commission IV. Tannur's 32-year-old-in-2024 son Ronald Tannur was tried in Surabaya for a car incident with one fatality in a parking lot building. Shortly after, Tannur deactivated from his position in parliament.

== Background ==
Edward Tannur was born in Atambua, East Nusa Tenggara Province. He attended elementary and high school in Atambua until 1979 before, during 2006–2009, moving on to and graduating in PGRI University Kupang with a Bachelor of Law. He is one of the Chinese Diaspora in Indonesia.

== Political career ==
Tannur's electoral history involves successes paralleling the 2009 Indonesian legislative election, 2014 Indonesian legislative election, and the 2019 Indonesian legislative election. Per the 2024 Indonesian legislative election, he is a legislative candidate or calon legislatif in Indonesian, colloquially and commonly called caleg for short.

=== Example of electoral process ===
In May 2023, in preparation for the 2024 Indonesian general election, Hary Tanoesoedibjo's then 28-year-old daughter Jessica Tanoesoedibjo of the Perindo Party signed up to contest for a seat in Tannur's electoral district. Other members of the 7 of Hary Tanoesoedibjo family contested elsewhere in Java, but their party failed to secure any seats, ending the election with less than 2% of the vote (the electoral threshold was 4%).

=== Son's car incident ===
Tannur gained media attention after his son Ronald Gregorius Tannur (alternatively Gregorius Ronald Tannur) killed his ex-partner Dini Sera Afrianti (aged 29) by colliding her with his car and battering her corpse with it in 2023. The incident happened in Fairway Nine, a shopping mall in Dukuhpakis, Surabaya. His proposed sentence is 12 years of imprisonment. In July 2024, the judge asked the court for Ronald Tannur to be "free of all charges". On 29 July 2024, the non-activation of Edward Tannur from DPR-RI was announced by PKB and Commission III legislator Heru Widodo while attending an audience session where Dini's family members were present.

== Business ventures ==
The business side of Edward Tannur includes officeholding Director of Swalayan Tulip (Daffodils Supermarket), self-service food retailer in Kupang, East Nusa Tenggara. In 1983, Tannur founded a construction service, through which he became well known. Tannur is also a former Head of Sasana Tulip serving 1997 to 2003 and former Head of Tulip FC, holding the position between 2000 and 2004.

== Other offices ==
- President (or Head) of the Indonesian National Association of Business Contractors (Gapeknas) Central Timor Regency period 2000–2004
- Pembina of the Association of Catholic Senior Students of the Republic of Indonesia (PMKRI) period 2004–2005
- President (or Head) of the Indonesian National Sports Committee (KONI) Central Timor Regency period 2004-2005
