= SLHS =

SLHS may refer to:

- St. Louis High School (disambiguation), several schools
- San Leandro High School, San Leandro, California, US
- Seven Lakes High School, Katy, Texas, US
- Show Low High School, Show Low, Arizona, US
- South Lakes High School, Reston, Virginia, US
- South Lyon High School, South Lyon, Michigan, US
- Spanaway Lake High School, Spanaway, Washington, US
- Standley Lake High School, Westminster, Colorado, US
