= Cliffton Wijaya =

Indonesian basketball player

Personal information
- Born: May 5, 2006 (age 20) Surabaya, Indonesia
- Listed height: 6 ft 3 in (1.91 m)
- Listed weight: 160 lb (73 kg)

Career information
- High school: St. Louis 1 (Surabaya, Indonesia)
- College: National Tsing Hua University (2024-present)
- Position: Power forward / shooting guard
Medals
Men's basketball
Representing Indonesia
ASEAN School Games
Gold medal – first place	2024 Da Nang	Team

Cliffton Wijaya (born May 5, 2005) is an Indonesian basketball player. He primarily plays the power forward position. As of April 2024 he is 6 feet 3 inches (1.91 m) tall and weighs 160 pounds (73 kg).

== High school career ==
Studied at St. Louis 1 Catholic High School Surabaya, Cliffton made history as the first ever student athlete to be selected as a DBL All-Star three times.

== National team career ==
Represented the Indonesia men's national under-16 basketball team at the 2022 FIBA Under-16 Asian Championship in Doha, Qatar, Cliffton averaged 12.7 points and 4.3 rebounds in three games.
