= Angela Tanoesoedibjo =

Indonesian businessperson and politician (born 1987)

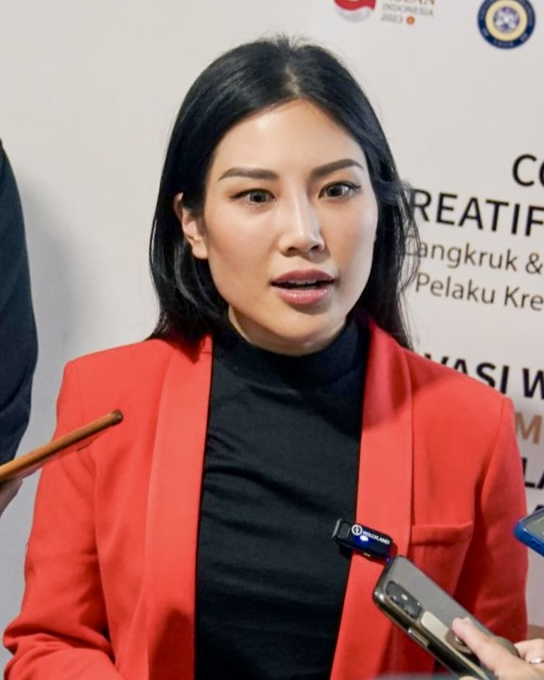
- Tanoesoedibjo in 2023

Vice Minister of Tourism and Creative Economy
- In office 25 October 2019 – 20 October 2024
- President: Joko Widodo
- Minister: Wishnutama; Sandiaga Uno
- Preceded by: Sapta Nirwandar
- Succeeded by: Ni Luh Puspa; Irene Umar

General Chairwoman of the Perindo Party
- Incumbent
- Assumed office 31 July 2024
- Preceded by: Hary Tanoesoedibjo

Personal details
- Born: Angela Herliani Tanoesoedibjo; 23 April 1987 (age 39) Ottawa, Canada
- Party: Perindo Party
- Spouse: Michael Dharmajaya (m. 2012)
- Children: 2
- Parents: Hary Tanoesoedibjo (father); Liliana Tanoesoedibjo (mother)
- Education: University of New South Wales (M.Com.); University of Technology Sydney (B.A.)
- Occupation: Businesswoman; politician
- Cabinet: Onward Indonesia Cabinet

Angela Herliani Tanoesoedibjo (/ˈændʒɪlə tɑːnjusudiːjaʊ/) ––known as Angela Chen (安琪拉·陳; Pinyin: Ānqílā chén) in China–– (born 23 April 1987) is an Indonesian politician, who is the Vice Minister of Tourism and Creative Economy since 2019, first under Wishnutama Kusubandio, then Sandiaga Uno, businesspersons. As the eldest daughter of MNC Group CEO, founder, and chairman Hary Tanoesoedibjo, she unexpectedly became one of the Jokowi-Ma'ruf Amin young ministerial candidates while co-currently the Commissioner of the MNC Group. As the editor in chief of Tanoesoedibjo Media Business Network's High End Magazine and High End Teen, Tanoesoedibjo holds this position.

== Education ==
2008 saw Tanoesoedibjo graduate from the University of Technology Sydney with a Bachelor of Arts in Communications (Media Arts and Productions). Additionally, in 2010, she graduated with a Master of Commerce in finance from the Australian School of Business at the University of New South Wales.

== Career ==
=== Business career ===
After finishing university, Tanoesoedibjo worked for the MNC Group as a finance staff member, becoming the heir apparent to the Hary Tanoesoedibjo family. She founded HighEnd Teen Magazine and HighEnd Magazine in 2008. In 2008 she became the Director of PT MNI Entertainment. In 2010, she joined the MNC Group media organization as a financial staff member. In 2014, she became the managing director of Global Television Network. In 2017, she oversaw Global Television's rebranding to GTV. In 2018 she became the managing director of Rajawali Citra Televisi Indonesia (RCTI).

=== Political career ===
Tanoesoedibjo ran alongside Dapil Jatim I Surabaya-Sidoarjo for the Indonesian Unity Party (Perindo) in the 2019 legislative election, however she was unable to make it to Senayan. Perindo suggested that she be named a minister in President Joko Widodo of the Republic of Indonesia's cabinet. On 25 October 2019, President Joko Widodo formally installed the vice ministers who would support the ranks of ministers of the Onward Indonesia Cabinet in governing the country for the next five years. It was formally confirmed that the then 32-year-old Tanoesoedibjo would serve as the Vice Minister of Tourism and Creative Economy.

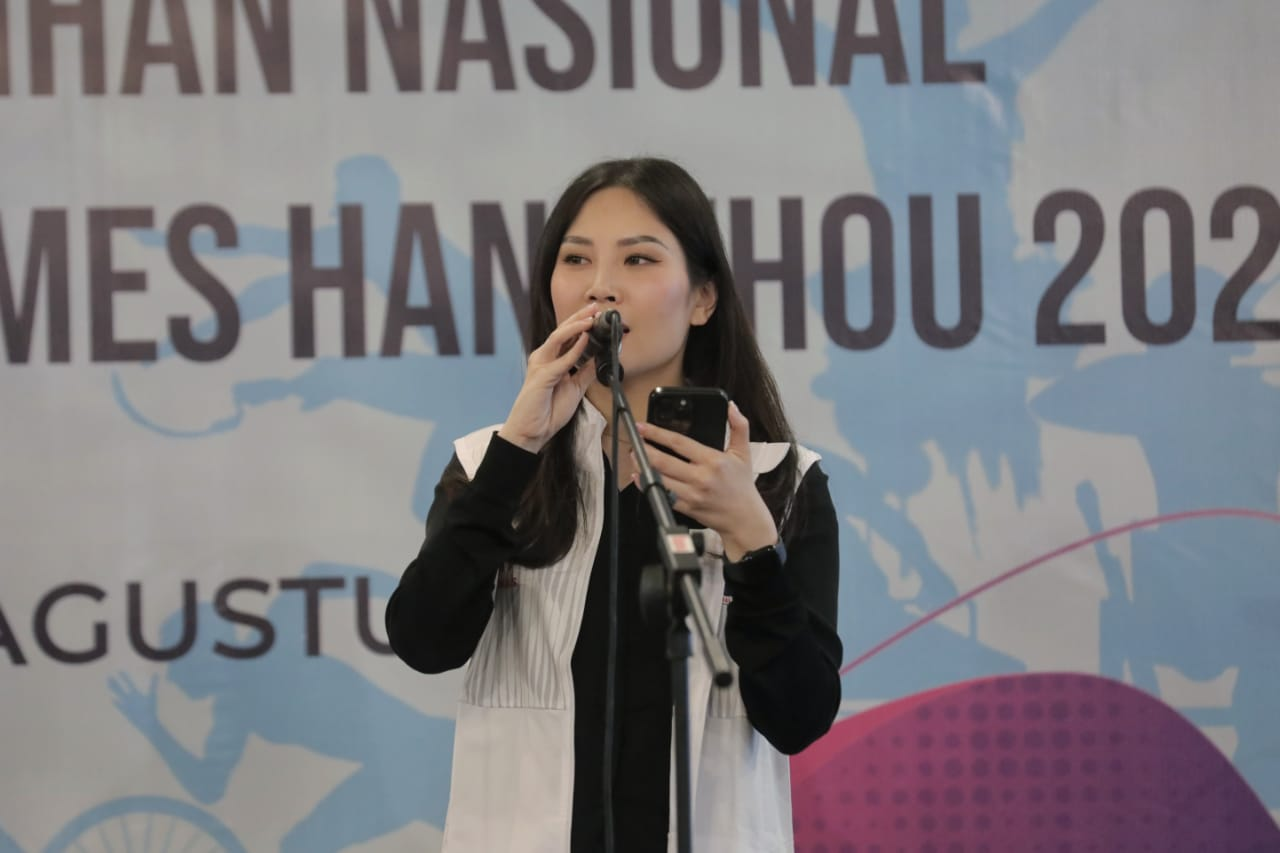
Tanoesoedibjo being appointed as Indonesia team's CdM in 2023

Tanoesoedibjo's background in the fields of management, media, retail and finance made her trusted by President Joko Widodo as someone who could develop the tourism industry and creative economy, especially for the development of 10 new tourist destinations. Since her appointment as vice minister, Tanoesoedibjo contributed to the implementation of the Gerak Cepat program, which aimed to revive Indonesia's tourism industry following the COVID-19 pandemic in Indonesia.

In anticipation of the 2024 presidential race, Ganjar Pranowo's National Winning Team (TPN) has named Tanoesoedibjo as its deputy chair. Andika Perkasa, the deputy chair of Ganjar Pranowo's National Winning Team (TPN) in the 2024 presidential election, made this clear. Andika clarified that the choice of her also served as a representation of Gen Z and the millennial generation. Furthermore, due to her skills, she is regarded as a qualified representation of TPN's younger generation.

Tanoesoedibjo was the Indonesian team's Chef de Mission (CdM) for the 2023 Asian Para Games in Hangzhou. Before she accepted the invitation to head the Red and White delegation at the Asian level disability sports tournament, she gave an explanation of the procedure. "I appreciate your trust. You were informed about it by Dito Ariotedjo, the Minister of Youth and Sports, exactly one week ago. I didn't believe it at first," she remarked. She hoped that good communication can be developed among all parties involved, and acknowledged that she was experiencing something fresh in her capacity as CdM.

Tanoesoedibjo succeeded her father as leader and General Chairwoman of the Perindo Party on 31 July 2024, the final day of the party's National Working Conference.

=== Performance in 2024 Indonesian general election ===
For the 2024 election, Tanoesoedibjo contested the East Java I electoral district, representing Surabaya City and Sidoarjo Regency, winning with 12,014 votes. Her sister Jessica Tanoesoedibjo contested in East Nusa Tenggara II, Edward Tannur's constituency. Her other family members contested elsewhere in Java. But the Perindo Party ended the election with 1.29 percent out of 4 percent required of the votes for the DPR, and so gained zero seats in the House of Representatives of Indonesia.

== Personal life ==
Angela Tanoesoedibjo was born in Ottawa on 23 April 1987, daughter of Hary Tanoesoedibjo, and the oldest sibling out of five. Tanoesoedibjo married businessman Michael Dharmajaya, on 12 December 2012, at Uluwatu Temple, Kuta, Badung, Bali. They have had two children.

== Recognitions ==
- Gen.T List (2022)
- Star of Merit, 1st Class (Bintang Jasa) (14 August 2024)
