= Development Basketball League =

Indonesian basketball league

Developmental Basketball League (DBL)
- Sport: Basketball
- Founded: 2004 (as DetEksi Basketball League), Surabaya, East Java
- First season: 2004
- Commissioner: Azrul Ananda
- No. of teams: 220
- Countries: Indonesia
- Headquarters: Surabaya, DBL Arena
- Continent: FIBA Asia
- Most recent champions: East Java Series: St. Louis 1 Senior High School (Boys); Gloria 1 Senior High School (Girls); Jakarta Series: Jubilee Jakarta High School (Boys); Jubilee Jakarta High School (Girls); South Sulawesi Series: SMA 11 Makassar (Boys); SMA 11 Makassar (Girls); Aceh Series: Methodist High School Banda Aceh (Boys); Methodist High School Banda Aceh (Girls)
- Most titles: St. Louis 1 Senior High School
- Website: www.dbl.id

Developmental Basketball League (DBL), previously named Deteksi Basketball League, is the largest basketball league competition for middle school and high school students in Indonesia. This league started in 2004 in Surabaya when it was still under the auspices of DetEksi, the youth department of the Jawa Pos newspaper, and was initiated by the then head of DetEksi, Azrul Ananda.

Since 2008, this basketball league has been managed professionally. Jawa Pos established a separate subsidiary to manage the basketball league, namely PT. Deteksi Basket Lintas Indonesia or better known as PT. DBL Indonesia.

Since 2018, DBL Indonesia has become an independent company that is no longer under the umbrella of Jawa Pos. Until now, Azrul Ananda is still listed as the founder and CEO of PT DBL Indonesia.

== History ==
=== 2004–2007: Humble beginning ===
DBL started in Surabaya in 2004. This league was intended as a simple high school league, but was organized in the right way. No professional or semipro players, no cigarette, alcohol or energy drink sponsors. Players must be student-athletes. Their performance in the classroom is just as important—or even more important—than their performance on the basketball court.

A total of 96 teams joined in this first season, from various cities in East Java Province. Since the first game, many people were aware that something special was happening. The first DBL match was very tight and emotional. The women's team at SMAN 20 Surabaya defeated SMA Santo Stanislaus 2 Surabaya. Tears of sadness and happiness were seen all around the field, watched by around 1,000 spectators. That year, the number of spectators was extraordinary for a high school level basketball competition.

Since then, more and more fans have come to watch. In the final round, more than 5,000 people came to watch (the record for the largest basketball audience in East Java at that time), and they were entertained by an emotional and dramatic match. SMAN 2 Surabaya became the men's champion, after forcing extra time with a desperate shot from outside the three-point line.

The success of the first DBL season helped the league to grow significantly. The more teams that join, the more spectators will watch. In fact, there were so many teams wanting to appear, DBL ran out of capacity to accept them all. Therefore, new participants must appear first in the qualifying round, eliminating each other towards the main round.

As the years go by, the standard of implementation also continues to increase. New rules were introduced to make the presentation of the match even better. Teams and spectators continue to be forced to follow increasingly strict rules.

In 2007, DBL matches were held as well as—or perhaps better—than professional and international matches. More than 55 thousand spectators watched DBL in 2007, almost four times as many as in 2004. A total of 220 teams competed in 2007, more than twice the number of participants in 2004. It was the last year where DBL was held as a regional league in the province of East Java.

The success of 2007 gave a sign that the time had come for DBL to spread its wings not just in East Java, but in other regions across Indonesia which began in 2008.

=== 2008–present: League expansion and evolution ===
==== 2008: DBL Movement ====
DBL established itself as the biggest basketball league in Indonesia in 2008. In that year, DBL started a new point to be handled more professionally with the formation of PT. Indonesian Cross Basketball Detection (DBL). The name of the Detective Basketball League evolved into the Developmental Basketball League.

Under the motto DBL Movement, the league expanded its reach beyond East Java to ten provinces with the help of Astra Honda Motor. To meet the demands of the number of participants, in East Java DBL is divided into two regions: North Region in Surabaya, South Region in Malang. Nine other new cities were spread across nine provinces, on five islands in Indonesia. Like in Surabaya, DBL received a warm welcome in other provinces. DBL was able to break participant and audience records. For example, in the cultural city of Jogjakarta, more than 16,500 people watched DBL in just six days. A figure that has never before been achieved for a basketball event.

Along with expanding its territory, DBL also made history through two international collaborations. The first is a long-term partnership with the world's most prestigious basketball league: the NBA. Every year, the NBA will send its players and coaches to help develop the top DBL players and coaches. The first official NBA event in Indonesia was held in Surabaya, 23–24 August 2008. The star was Danny Granger, top scorer for the Indiana Pacers.

The second international collaboration is with the Australian government. In October 2008, the DBL sent its first All-Star teams (men's and women's) to Perth, to study and compete against selected youth teams from Western Australia.

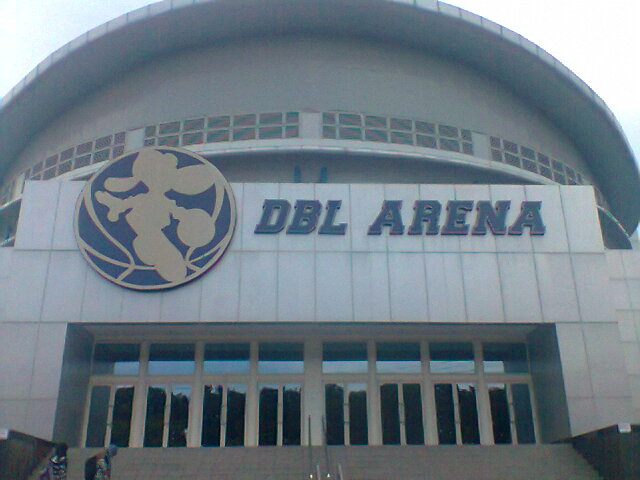
DBL Arena

As a complement, in 2008 DBL also opened its new basketball building, DBL Arena. The building was built in just seven months. One of the best buildings in Indonesia, it has a capacity of 5,000 spectators.

==== 2009–present: Continuous growth ====
DBL continues to grow every year. The new point was marked by the formation of PT DBL Indonesia so that this league could continue to run sustainably. In 2018, this league was implemented consistently in 30 cities and 22 provinces in Indonesia. From Aceh to Papua. In each match, the number of spectators present in the arena ranges from 3,000 - 10,000 people.

That year, the number of basketball players competing in the DBL was recorded at more than 35,000 people. They come from 850 schools spread across 195 cities and districts. The number of matches in that season reached more than 1,350 matches.

In total, DBL league participants grew to reach 1.2 million people. In Indonesia, there is no student-level sports league that is able to involve as many young people as DBL Indonesia does.

== Appreciation from the President of the Republic of Indonesia ==
This achievement was recognized by the 7th President of the Republic of Indonesia Ir. H. Joko Widodo. Because of this achievement, President Joko Widodo invited the best DBL league players to the Bogor State Palace to play basketball with him and a number of State Ministers.

== List of defending champions of the DBL competition in each province ==
| Province | Season | Men's champion | Women's champion |
|---|---|---|---|
| Aceh | 2025 | SMA Methodist Banda Aceh | SMAN 1 Langsa |
| North Sumatra | 2025 | SMA Methodist 2 Medan | SMA Methodist 2 Medan |
| Riau | 2026 | SMA Darma Yudha Pekanbaru | SMA Darma Yudha Pekanbaru |
| West Sumatra | 2026 | SMA Negeri 2 Bukittinggi | SMA Don Bosco Padang |
| Jambi | 2025 | SMK Unggul Sakti Jambi | SMA Suria Harapan Jambi |
| South Sumatera | 2026 | SMA Xaverius 1 Palembang | SMA BSI Palembang |
| Lampung | 2025 | SMA Negeri 10 Bandar Lampung | SMA Negeri 10 Bandar Lampung |
| Banten | 2025 | UPH College Tangerang | SMA Kharisma Bangsa Tangerang Selatan |
| Jakarta | 2025 | SMA Bukit Sion Jakarta | SMA Jubilee Jakarta |
| West Java | 2026 | SMA Negeri 9 Bandung | SMA BPK Penabur Cirebon |
| Central Java | 2026 | SMA Semesta Bilingual Boarding School Semarang | SMA Kristen Tritunggal Semarang |
| Yogyakarta | 2026 | SMA Bopkri 1 Yogyakarta | SMA Stella Duce 1 Yogyakarta |
| East Java | 2026 | SMA Katolik St. Louis 1 Surabaya | SMA Katolik St. Louis 1 Surabaya |
| Bali | 2025 | SMA Negeri 2 Denpasar | SMA Negeri 1 Denpasar |
| West Nusa Tenggara | 2026 | SMA Negeri 1 Mataram | SMA Negeri 5 Mataram |
| East Nusa Tenggara | 2025 | SMA Negeri 1 Kupang | SMA Regina Pacis Bajawa |
| West Kalimantan | 2025 | SMA Santo Paulus Pontianak | SMA Santo Paulus Pontianak |
| South Kalimantan | 2026 | SMA Negeri 7 Banjarmasin | SMA Negeri 2 Banjarmasin |
| East Kalimantan | 2026 | SMA Negeri 1 Balikpapan | SMA Negeri 1 Balikpapan |
| North Sulawesi | 2025 | SMA Eben Haezar Manado | Manado Independent School |
| South Sulawesi | 2026 | SMA Zion Makassar | SMA Negeri 11 Makassar |
| Papua | 2025 | SMA YPPK Teruna Bakti Jayapura | SMA YPPK Asisi Sentani |

== List of winners of the most DBL competitions in each province ==
The following is a list of schools in each province that have won the DBL most often in each province for the 2004–2025 season.

| Province | School name | Men's champion | Women's champion | Total champion |
|---|---|---|---|---|
| Aceh | SMA Negeri 1 Banda Aceh | 1 | 5 | 6 |
| Aceh | SMA Methodist Banda Aceh | 4 | 1 | 5 |
| Aceh | SMA Negeri 2 Banda Aceh | 1 | 2 | 3 |
| Sumatera Utara | SMA Soetomo 1 Medan | 7 | 3 | 10 |
| Sumatera Utara | SMA Wahidin Medan | 1 | 6 | 7 |
| Sumatera Utara | SMA Methodist 2 Medan | 1 | 1 | 2 |
| Riau | SMA Negeri 1 Pekanbaru | 5 | 4 | 9 |
| Riau | SMA Santa Maria Pekanbaru | 1 | 3 | 4 |
| Riau | SMAN 1 Teluk Kuantan | 2 | 1 | 3 |
| Sumatera Barat | SMA Don Bosco Padang | 7 | 6 | 13 |
| Sumatera Barat | SMAN 3 Bukittinggi | 1 | 1 | 2 |
| Jambi | SMA Xaverius 1 Jambi | 4 | 2 | 6 |
| Jambi | SMA Bina Kasih Jambi | 3 | - | 3 |
| Jambi | SMAN 2 Tebo | - | 3 | 3 |
| Sumatera Selatan | SMA Negeri 1 Sekayu | 1 | 3 | 4 |
| Sumatera Selatan | SMA Xaverius 3 Palembang | 3 | - | 3 |
| Sumatera Selatan | SMAN 2 Muara Enim | 2 | 1 | 3 |
| Lampung | SMA YP Unila Bandar Lampung | 6 | - | 6 |
| Lampung | SMA Negeri 2 Bandar Lampung | 3 | 2 | 5 |
| Lampung | SMAN 1 Natar | - | 5 | 5 |
| Banten | UPH College Tangerang | 3 | 4 | 7 |
| Banten | SMA Kristen Penabur Gading Serpong | 2 | - | 2 |
| Banten | SMA Kharisma Bangsa Tangerang | 2 | - | 2 |
| Banten | SMA Thomas Aquino Tangerang | - | 2 | 2 |
| DKI Jakarta | SMA Negeri 3 Jakarta | 2 | 3 | 5 |
| DKI Jakarta | SMA Bukit Sion Jakarta | 4 | - | 4 |
| DKI Jakarta | SMA PSKD 1 Jakarta | 1 | 1 | 2 |
| DKI Jakarta | SMAI Al-Izhar Pondok Labu | 1 | - | 1 |
| DKI Jakarta | SMAN 116 Jakarta | 1 | 1 | 2 |
| SMA Negeri 28 Jakarta | - | 2 | 2 | |
| Jawa Barat | SMA Negeri 9 Bandung | 4 | 4 | 8 |
| Jawa Barat | SMA Trinitas | 2 | - | 2 |
| Jawa Barat | SMA Bina Bakti Bandung | 2 | - | 2 |
| Jawa Barat | SMA Negeri 2 Bandung | 1 | 1 | 2 |
| Jawa Barat | SMA Negeri 1 Baleendah | - | 2 | 2 |
| Jawa Tengah | SMA Karang Turi Semarang | 6 | 4 | 10 |
| Jawa Tengah | SMA Theresiana 1 Semarang | 3 | 3 | 6 |
| Jawa Tengah | SMA Tritunggal Semarang | - | 2 | 2 |
| DI Yogyakarta | SMA Bopkri 1 Yogyakarta | 6 | 1 | 7 |
| DI Yogyakarta | SMA Stella Duce 1 Yogyakarta | - | 7 | 7 |
| DI Yogyakarta | SMA Negeri 4 Yogyakarta | 2 | 3 | 5 |
| Jawa Timur | SMA Katolik St. Louis 1 Surabaya | 6 | 5 | 11 |
| Jawa Timur | SMA Katolik Frateran Surabaya | 3 | 2 | 5 |
| Bali | SMA Negeri 1 Denpasar | 9 | 9 | 18 |
| Bali | SMA Negeri 2 Denpasar | 2 | 0 | 2 |
| Nusa Tenggara Barat | SMA Katolik Kusuma Cakranegara Mataram | 6 | - | 6 |
| Nusa Tenggara Barat | SMA Negeri 5 Mataram | 3 | 2 | 5 |
| Nusa Tenggara Barat | SMA Negeri 1 Mataram | 1 | 4 | 5 |
| Nusa Tenggara Timur | SMA Negeri 3 Kupang | 4 | 1 | 5 |
| Nusa Tenggara Timur | SMA Regina Pacis Bajawa | 0 | 4 | 4 |
| Nusa Tenggara Timur | SMA Negeri 3 Kupang | 2 | 0 | 2 |
| Kalimantan Barat | SMA Santu Petrus Pontianak | 12 | 9 | 21 |
| Kalimantan Barat | SMA Bina Mulia Pontianak | - | 2 | 2 |
| Kalimantan Selatan | SMA Negeri 1 Banjarbaru | 4 | 3 | 7 |
| Kalimantan Selatan | SMA Negeri 2 Banjarmasin | 2 | 5 | 7 |
| Kalimantan Selatan | SMA Negeri 7 Banjarmasin | 3 | 2 | 5 |
| Kalimantan Timur | SMA Negeri 1 Balikpapan | 2 | 5 | 7 |
| Kalimantan Timur | SMA Negeri 3 Samarinda | 1 | 3 | 4 |
| Kalimantan Timur | SMA Negeri 5 Balikpapan | 2 | - | 2 |
| Sulawesi Utara | SMAK Eben Haezar Manado | 5 | 12 | 17 |
| Sulawesi Utara | SMA Lokon Santo Nikolaus Tomohon | 11 | 1 | 12 |
| Sulawesi Utara | Manado Independent School | 1 | 4 | 5 |
| Sulawesi Selatan | SMA Negeri 11 Makassar | 3 | 5 | 8 |
| Sulawesi Selatan | SMA Dian Harapan Makassar | 2 | 2 | 4 |
| Sulawesi Selatan | SMA Negeri 2 Makassar | 2 | 2 | 4 |
| Papua | SMA Negeri 1 Merauke | 2 | 4 | 6 |
| Papua | SMA John 23 Merauke | 4 | - | 4 |
| Papua | SMA Negeri 2 Jayapura | 1 | 2 | 3 |

Sumber:

== DBL All-Star (Boys) ==
=== 2025 Good Day DBL All-Star Chicago ===
| Pos | Name | Age | Ht. | School | Nat |
|---|---|---|---|---|---|
| G | Miracle Christiano | 15 | 1.77 m (5'9) | SMA Raffles Christian School | Indonesia |
| F | Fathy Muhammad Zhafif | 17 | 1.90 m (6'3) | SMAN 5 Bogor | Indonesia |
| F | Jordan Marcellino Darma | 18 | 1.83 m (6'0) | SMA Methodist 2 Medan | Indonesia |
| F | Steven Sebastian | 17 | 1.89 m (6'2) | SMAN 9 Bandung | Indonesia |
| F | Riovaldo Renjiro Leonardy | 18 | 1.85 m (6'1) | SMA Bukit Sion Jakarta | Indonesia |
| C | Rafky Abqary Basri | 17 | 1.88 m (6'2) | SMA Labschool Kebayoran | Indonesia |
| F | Chimaobi Nzekwue | 17 | 1.87 m (6'1) | SMA Jubilee Jakarta | Indonesia Nigeria |
| C | Ryansean Bastian Gunawan | 17 | 1.91 m (6'3) | SMA Bukit Sion Jakarta | Indonesia |
| G | Sean Jason Nathan Kilapong | 17 | 1.84 m (6'0) | SMAN 1 Balikpapan | Indonesia |
| G | Gerrard Matthew Boentara | 18 | 1.78 m (5'10) | SMA Cita Hati East Surabaya | Indonesia |
| G | Efrael Yerusyalom Enrichia | 17 | 1.82 m (5'11) | SMA Bukit Sion Jakarta | Indonesia |
| G | Matthew Ivander Setiawan | 15 | 1.82 m (5'11) | SMA Raffles Christian School | Indonesia |

Coaches:

- Gian Gumilar (SMAN 9 Bandung)
- Rimbun Maruli (SMA Pangudi Luhur Jakarta)

=== 2024 Good Day DBL All-Star Chicago ===
| Pos | Name | Age | Ht. | School | Nat |
|---|---|---|---|---|---|
| G | Revan Surya Winatha | 18 | 1.79 m (5'10) | SMAN 2 Denpasar | Indonesia |
| F | I Ketut Gede Bayu Prayoga | 18 | 1.87 m (6'1) | SMAN 1 Denpasar | Indonesia |
| G | Justin Patrick Alex | 19 | 1.83 m (6'0) | SMA St. Louis 1 Surabaya | Indonesia |
| G | Yogie Putra Darmawan | 18 | 1.78 m (5'10) | SMA Gloria 1 Surabaya | Indonesia |
| F | Zaky Alhakim | 19 | 1.83 m (6'0) | SMA Warga Surakarta | Indonesia |
| F | Fathy Muhammad Zhafif | 17 | 1.87 m (6'1) | SMAN 5 Bogor | Indonesia |
| G | Kenneth Leebron Huang | 18 | 1.68 m (5'6) | SMA Jubilee Jakarta | Indonesia |
| F | Riovaldo Renjiro Leonardy | 17 | 1.87 m (6'1) | SMA Bukit Sion Jakarta | Indonesia |
| C | Ryansean Bastian Gunawan | 17 | 1.90 m (6'3) | SMA Bukit Sion Jakarta | Indonesia |
| G | Jeremy Abner Aritonang | 18 | 1.71 m (5'8) | UPH College Tangerang | Indonesia |
| F | Refka Raksha Ramadhan | 18 | 1.87 m (6'1) | SMAN Ragunan Jakarta | Indonesia |
| F | Muhammad Haikal Malik | 19 | 1.90 m (6'3) | SMAN 1 Bengkulu Selatan | Indonesia |

Coaches:

- Zulfahrizal (SMA Al-Maruf)
- Chandra Prasetya (UPH College Tangerang)

=== 2023 Good Day DBL All-Star Chicago ===
| Pos | # | Name | Age | Ht. | School | Nat |
|---|---|---|---|---|---|---|
| F | 10 | I Nyoman Aldo Dharma Yudha | 18 | 1.83 m (6'0) | SMAN 1 Denpasar | Indonesia |
| C | 4 | I Ketut Gede Bayu Prayoga | 16 | 1.87 m (6'2) | SMAN 1 Denpasar | Indonesia |
| G | 1 | Justin Patrick Alex | 17 | 1.83 m (6'0) | SMA St. Louis 1 Surabaya | Indonesia |
| F | 18 | Cliffton Wijaya | 18 | 1.90 m (6'3) | SMA St. Louis 1 Surabaya | Indonesia |
| F | 16 | Tan Evan Roos | 17 | 1.85 m (6'1) | SMA Trinitas Bandung | Indonesia |
| C | 6 | Elang Satria Rajendra Dewanto | 18 | 1.84 m (6'0) | SMAN 2 Surabaya | Indonesia |
| F | 17 | Richie Bertrand Linardi | 18 | 1.86 m (6'1) | SMA Gloria 1 Surabaya | Indonesia |
| G | 26 | Kennie Elbert Kristanto | 17 | 1.80 m (5'11) | SMA Gloria 1 Surabaya | Indonesia |
| C | 23 | Zihad Visabilillah | 19 | 1.98 m (6'6) | SMA BPK Penabur Cirebon | Indonesia |
| F | 14 | Gerald Haikal Nababan | 19 | 1.90 m (6'3) | SMAN 5 Balikpapan | Indonesia |
| C | 12 | Halmaheranno Aprianto Lolaru | 18 | 1.93 m (6'4) | SMK Santo Mikael Surakarta | Indonesia |
| F | 21 | Jacob Marthen Swandiwe Rumbino | 18 | 1.76 m (5'9) | SMA YPK 2 Biak | Indonesia |

Coaches:

- Jap Ricky Lesmana (SMA Bukit Sion Jakarta)
- Agung Indra Perkasa (Global Prestasi School)

=== 2022 KFC DBL All-Star Chicago ===
| Pos | # | Name | Age | Ht. | School | Nat |
|---|---|---|---|---|---|---|
| G | 5 | Aditya Wiguna Sulistyo | 17 | 1.77 m (5'9) | SMA Regina Pacis Bogor | Indonesia |
| C | 14 | Kent Zhenoe | 18 | 1.97 m (6'6) | SMA Trinitas Bandung | Indonesia |
| F | 4 | Fabian Rishad Haswidi | 18 | 1.90 m (6'3) | SMAN 2 Bandung | Indonesia |
| F | 10 | Cliffton Wijaya | 17 | 1.90 m (6'3) | SMA St. Louis 1 Surabaya | Indonesia |
| F | 13 | Cliff Louis | 18 | 1.88 m (6'2) | SMA St. Louis 1 Surabaya | Indonesia |
| F | 6 | Elang Satria Rajendra Dewanto | 17 | 1.84 m (6'0) | SMAN 2 Surabaya | Indonesia |
| C | 11 | Terell Ayers | 18 | 2.00 m (6'7) | SMA BPK Penabur Cirebon | Indonesia |
| C | 75 | Laurent Valentius Gunadi | 18 | 1.99 m (6'6) | UPH College Tangerang | Indonesia |
| G | 7 | Dayrent Cristiano Tjiang | 18 | 1.75 m (5'9) | SMA Dian Harapan Makassar | Indonesia |
| G | 8 | Sharkeenan Mahindrarta | 17 | 1.81 m (5'11) | SMA Labschool Kebayoran | Indonesia |
| C | 12 | Halmaheranno Aprianto Lolaru | 17 | 1.93 m (6'4) | SMK Santo Mikael Surakarta | Indonesia |
| G | 9 | Fathur Rahman | 18 | 1.81 m (5'11) | SMAN 116 Jakarta | Indonesia |

Coaches:

- Oktavianus Theodorus (SMAN 2 Bitung)
- Bayu (SMAN 34 Jakarta)

=== 2021 Honda DBL All-Star Los Angeles ===
| Pos | # | Name | Age | Ht. | School | Nat |
|---|---|---|---|---|---|---|
| G | 5 | Gede Elgi Wimbardi | 17 | 1.80 m | SMAN 2 Denpasar | Indonesia |
| G | 28 | Jordan Mintarza | 19 | 1.83 m | SMA St. Louis 1 Surabaya | Indonesia |
| F | 19 | Cliff Louis | 16 | 1.85 m | SMA St. Louis 1 Surabaya | Indonesia |
| F | 18 | Cliffton Wijaya | 16 | 1.90 m | SMA St. Louis 1 Surabaya | Indonesia |
| F | 17 | Justin Jaya Wiyanto | 18 | 1.86 m | SMA Warga Surakarta | Indonesia |
| G | 3 | Yosua Nathanael | 18 | 1.78 m | SMA Trimulia Bandung | Indonesia |
| C | 22 | Terell Ayers | 16 | 2.00 m | SMA BPK Penabur Cirebon | Indonesia |
| C | 23 | Laurent Valentius Gunadi | 17 | 1.99 m | UPH College Tangerang | Indonesia |
| G | 16 | Likemo Victor Deo Putra Conrad | 17 | 1.87 m | SMA BPK Penabur Cirebon | Indonesia Cameroon |
| G | 8 | Aaron Nathanael | 18 | 1.82 m | SMA Bukit Sion Jakarta | Indonesia |
| F | 12 | Rafael Pasha | 18 | 1.90 m | SMA Bukit Sion Jakarta | Indonesia |
| C | 30 | Almando David | 17 | 1.93 m | SMAN 71 Jakarta | Indonesia |

=== 2020 DBL All-Star ===
(CANCELLED)

=== 2019 Honda DBL All-Star California ===
| Pos | # | Name | Age | Ht. | School | Nat |
|---|---|---|---|---|---|---|
| C | 20 | Fernando Manansang | 17 | 1.84 m | SMA Lokon St. Nikolaus Tomohon | Indonesia |
| C | 24 | Armando Freidrik Jagiwar Kaize | 17 | 1.95 m | SMA John 23 Merauke | Indonesia |
| F | 21 | Julian Chalias | 17 | 1.91 m | SMA Soverdi Tuban | Indonesia |
| G | 1 | Andreas Marcellino Bonfilio | 18 | 1.67 m | SMA St. Louis 1 Surabaya | Indonesia |
| G | 9 | Calsen Vierry | 18 | 1.76 m | SMA Gloria 1 Surabaya | Indonesia |
| G | 10 | Mario Davidson | 17 | 1.77 m | SMA Karangturi Semarang | Indonesia |
| F | 16 | Dearren Alvado Glendyap | 17 | 1.87 m | SMA BOPKRI 1 Yogyakarta | Indonesia |
| F | 13 | Grady Cahyadi | 17 | 1.84 m | SMA 1 BPK Penabur Bandung | Indonesia |
| G | 7 | Mohammed Aofar Hedyan | 17 | 1.74 m | SMA Kharisma Bangsa Tangerang | Indonesia |
| G | 8 | Aaron Nathanael | 16 | 1.84 m | SMA Bukit Sion Jakarta | Indonesia |
| F | 14 | Rafael Pasha | 16 | 1.85 m | SMA Bukit Sion Jakarta | Indonesia |
| C | 22 | William Hardi Dinata | 17 | 1.94 m | SMA Santu Petrus Pontianak | Indonesia |

Coaches:

- Cahyandri (SMK Unggul Sakti Jambi)
- Dhimas Aniz (SMAN 2 Surabaya)

=== 2018 Honda DBL All-Star California ===
| Pos | # | Name | Age | Ht. | School | Nat |
|---|---|---|---|---|---|---|
| G | 1 | Mohammed Aofar Hedyan | 17 | 1.77 m | SMA Kharisma Bangsa Tangerang Selatan | Indonesia |
| G | 2 | Sadam Asyruna | 18 | 1.76 m | SMA Kharisma Bangsa Tangerang Selatan | Indonesia |
| C | 16 | Julian Alexandre Chalias | 16 | 1.91 m | SMA Soverdi Tuban | Indonesia |
| G | 3 | Andreas Marcellino Bonfilio | 17 | 1.67 m | SMA St. Louis 1 Surabaya | Indonesia |
| G | 9 | Arlan Alexander Sisnowidono | 17 | 1.69 m | SMA BPK Penabur Cirebon | Indonesia |
| G | 13 | Mario Davidson | 17 | 1.77 m | SMA Karangturi Semarang | Indonesia |
| G | 5 | Alvaro Claudio Lamia | 17 | ? m | SMAN 1 Jayapura Jayapura | Indonesia |
| F | 19 | Fernando Fransco Manansang | 16 | 1.85 m | SMA Lokon Tomohon | Indonesia |
| C | 28 | Muhammad Naufal Alifio Rizq | 17 | 1.97 m | SMAN 20 Surabaya | Indonesia |
| G | 18 | Charisma Lie | 18 | ? m | SMAN 1 Denpasar | Indonesia |
| C | 17 | Anthoni Putra Aipassa (RIP) | 16 | 1.99 m | SMAN Jhon 23 Merauke | Indonesia |
| G | 7 | Darryl Sebastian | 17 | 1.82 m | SMA Bukit Sion Jakarta | Indonesia |

Coaches:

- Jap Ricky Lesmana (SMA Bukit Sion Jakarta)
- Docta Ignoran Pambudi (SMA Karangturi Semarang)

=== 2017 Honda DBL All-Star Los Angeles ===
| Pos | # | Name | Age | School | Nat |
|---|---|---|---|---|---|
| F | 1 | Andrew W. Lensun | 17 | SMA Lokon Tomohon | Indonesia |
| F | 2 | Darryl Sebastian | 16 | SMA Bukit Sion Jakarta | Indonesia |
| G | 3 | Yohannes Aristharkus | 18 | SMA 1 Bina Bakti Bandung | Indonesia |
| G | 4 | Felix Fugiarto | 18 | SMA Bopkri 1 Yogyakarta | Indonesia |
| G | 7 | James Patrick | 17 | SMA St. Louis 1 Surabaya | Indonesia |
| G | 10 | Ezra Mandarin | 17 | SMA St. Aloysius Bandung | Indonesia |
| C | 18 | Evander Adam | 17 | SMA Trinitas Bandung | Indonesia |
| F | 19 | Mekhail Fidel Afloubun | 17 | SMA Theresiana 1 Semarang | Indonesia |
| C | 21 | Nickson Damara Gosal | 17 | SMA Kesuma Mataram | Indonesia |
| C | 22 | William Rivaldi Kosasih | 17 | SMA Cita Hati Surabaya | Indonesia |
| F | 23 | Kelvin Sanjaya | 17 | SMAN 1 Pekanbaru | Indonesia |
| F | 25 | Antony William | 17 | SMAN 71 Jakarta | Indonesia |

Coaches:

- Daniel Siswanto (SMA Trinitas Bandung)
- Moses Foresto (SMAN 2 Pekanbaru)

=== 2016 Honda DBL All-Star San Francisco ===
| Name | School | Nat |
|---|---|---|
| Juan Harsab Maulana | SMA Sutomo 1 Medan | Indonesia |
| I B Ananta Wisnu Putra | SMAN 2 Denpasar | Indonesia |
| Winston Swenjaya | SMA Santo Yoseph Denpasar | Indonesia |
| Darren Benaya Budiman | SMA Bina Bakti 1 Bandung | Indonesia |
| Gevan Audeka | Nation Star Academy Surabaya | Indonesia |
| Naja Nazala Hidayat | SMAN 1 Blitar | Indonesia |
| Jason Lie Santoso | SMA Bukit Sion Jakarta | Indonesia |
| James Huang Alvaro | SMA Bukit Sion Jakarta | Indonesia |
| Andreas Kristian Vieri | Nation Star Academy Surabaya | Indonesia |
| Christopher Jason W. | SMA St. Louis 1 Surabaya | Indonesia |
| Adrian Yusuf Atmadireja | SMAN 3 Jakarta | Indonesia |
| Hriscahyo Yoel Agviandi | SMAN 1 Bopkri Yogyakarta | Indonesia |

Coaches:

- Tubagus Arief Mu'min (SMA Santa Lauresia Tangerang)
- Dewanta Aji Putra (SMA Budi Mulia Dua Yogyakarta)

=== 2015 Honda DBL All-Star California ===
| Pos | Name | School | Nat |
|---|---|---|---|
| SG | Muhammad Athar Z. | SMAN 4 Yogyakarta | Indonesia |
| PG | Winston Swenjaya | SMA Santo Yoseph Denpasar | Indonesia |
| SF | Abram Jonathan | SMA Saint John Tangerang | Indonesia |
| SG | Samuel Devin Susanto | SMA Regina Pacis Surakarta | Indonesia |
| SF | Alvin Christian Santoso | SMA Gloria 1 Surabaya | Indonesia |
| PF | Christopher Reinhar L. | SMA St. Louis 1 Surabaya | Indonesia |
| PF | Ikram Fadhil | SMAN 5 Surabaya | Indonesia |
| C | Henry Cornelis Lakay | SMA John XXIII Merauke | Indonesia |
| C | Leonardo Effendy | SMA Xaverius 1 Palembang | Indonesia |
| SG | Rufin Ariozonda | SMA Pahoa Tangerang | Indonesia |
| C | Gerdy Martiano R. | SMA Gloria 1 Surabaya | Indonesia |

Coaches:

- Agung Christyanto
- Yullius Dobby Putrandana

=== 2014 Honda DBL All-Star California ===
| Pos | Name | School | Nat |
|---|---|---|---|
| G | Teemo | SMA Sutomo 1 Medan | Indonesia |
| G | Muhammad Fhirdan Guntara | SMAN 9 Bandung | Indonesia |
| G | Andrian Danny Christianto | SMA Kanaan Banjarmasin | Indonesia |
| F | Michael Andianto | SMA St. Angela Bandung | Indonesia |
| F | Abram Jonathan | SMA Saint John Tangerang | Indonesia |
| F | Erick Jonathan Gosal | SMA Dian Harapan Makassar | Indonesia |
| G | Yefanus Rendika | SMA Bukit Sion Jakarta | Indonesia |
| G | Dewa Ade Ryan | SMAN 1 Denpasar | Indonesia |
| F | Dhanawan Prasidya Soegondo | SMA Al-Izhar Pondok Labu Jakarta | Indonesia |
| F | Krisna Danuarta Dyputra | SMAN 1 Denpasar | Indonesia |
| F | Petrus Brando Saragih Turnip | SMA Methodist 2 Medan | Indonesia |
| C | Gabriel Jorge Josua Senduk | SMA Lokon Tomohon | Indonesia |

Coaches:

- Andromeda Grasiosa (UPH College Tangerang)
- Freddy Marcos Gorey (SMAN 3 Jakarta)

=== 2013 DBL All-Star San Francisco ===
| Pos | Name | School | Nat |
|---|---|---|---|
| G | Riogo Deswara | SMA Cendana Pekanbaru | Indonesia |
| G | Andre Rorimpandey | SMA Don Bosco Bitung | Indonesia |
| G | Putu Quentin Mahayana Prizler | SMA Santo Yoseph Denpasar | Indonesia |
| F | Samuel Evan Hardy | SMAN 116 Jakarta | Indonesia |
| F | Marvanico Tjokrosoeharto | SMA Kolose Santo Yusup Malang | Indonesia |
| G | Shamgar Galed Laransedu | SMA Trinitas Bandung | Indonesia |
| G | Cakrawala Satria Airawan | SMAN 3 Jakarta | Indonesia |
| F | William Ruddyanto | SMAN 3 Bandung | Indonesia |
| F | Rivaldo Tandra Panghestio | SMA Santu Petrus Pontianak | Indonesia |
| F | Liem Indra Wijaya | SMA Theresiana 1 Semarang | Indonesia |
| C | Adhitya Kusuma Aghystha Saputra | SMAN 116 Jakarta | Indonesia |
| C | Gabriel Jorge Josua Senduk | SMA Lokon Tomohon | Indonesia |

Coaches:

- Ateng Sugijanto (SMA IPH Surabaya)
- Jap Ricky Lesmana (SMA Bukit Sion Jakarta)

=== 2012 DBL All-Star Seattle ===
| Pos | Name | School | Nat |
|---|---|---|---|
| G | Hans Abraham | SMA 1 PSKD Jakarta | Indonesia |
| G | Hutomo Rio Pangesthio | SMK Immanuel 1 Pontianak | Indonesia |
| G | Ricky Kartika Istiadi | SMAN 1 Denpasar | Indonesia |
| F | Julius Caesar Wongso | SMA Santu Petrus Pontianak | Indonesia |
| C | Juan Laurent Kokodiputra | SMA Trinitas Bandung | Indonesia |
| G | I Komang Septian | SMAN 9 Surabaya | Indonesia |
| G | Andrey Rido Mahardika | SMAN 116 Jakarta | Indonesia |
| F | Nuke Tri Saputra | SMAN 14 Semarang | Indonesia |
| F | Kennard | SMA Trinitas Bandung | Indonesia |
| F | Muhammad Reza Guntara | SMAN 9 Bandung | Indonesia |
| C | Ferdian Dwi Purwoko | SMA Islamic Village Tangerang | Indonesia |

Coaches:

- Johanes Didik (SMA Karangturi Semarang)
- Sugandi (SMA BPK Penabur Tangerang)

== DBL All-Star (Girls) ==
=== 2022 DBL All-Star Chicago ===
| Pos | # | Name | Age | Ht. | School | Nat |
|---|---|---|---|---|---|---|
| F | 22 | Berlian Yesi Triutari | 16 | 1.75 m | SMA BPK Penabur Cirebon | Indonesia |
| C | 28 | Nathania Nicole Sasongko | 16 | 1.82 m | SMA Gloria 1 Surabaya | Indonesia |
| F | 4 | Queeny Alexandria | 17 | 1.75 m | SMA Santu Petrus Pontianak | Indonesia |
| F | 85 | Erinindita Prias Madafa | 17 | 1.70 m | SMA Tritunggal Semarang | Indonesia |
| F | 9 | Juliette Aimee Gogus Putra | 17 | 1.72 m | SMA Karangturi Semarang | Indonesia |
| G | 5 | Hillary Jesslyn | 16 | 1.67 m | Sekolah Bunda Mulia Jakarta | Indonesia |
| F | 6 | Syarafina Ayasha Sjahril | 18 | 1.71 m | SMAN 70 Jakarta | Indonesia |
| G | 15 | Maxine Maria Sutisna | 16 | 1.73 m | SMAN 70 Jakarta | Indonesia |
| G | 4 | Deewell Windy Dido Gosal | 17 | 1.65 m | UPH College Tangerang | Indonesia |
| F | 13 | Vanissa Renata Siregar | 17 | 1.74 m | UPH College Tangerang | Indonesia |
| C | 8 | Monica Selviana Rivika Putri | 18 | 1.74 m | SMA Stella Duce 1 Yogyakarta | Indonesia |
| C | 9 | Evangeline Clarissa Djohan | 16 | 1.78 m | SMA High Scope Jakarta | Indonesia |

Coaches:

- Kencana Wukir (SMA Frateran Surabaya)
- Sani Wulandari (SMA 1 PSKD Jakarta)

== Notable players ==
- Hardianus Lakudu, Participant DBL East Kalimantan 2012
- Vincent Rivaldi Kosasih, Champion Junior DBL Surabaya 2010
- Juan Laurent Kokodiputra, DBL All-Star 2011 & 2012
- Yesaya Saudale, Champion DBL 3x3 National Championship 2016
- Muhammad Reza Guntara, DBL All-Star 2012
- Henry Cornelis Lakay, DBL All-Star 2015
- Kevin Sitorus, DBL All-Star 2010
- Hans Abraham, DBL All-Star 2012
- Yudha Saputera, DBL Participant in West Java Series 2014 & 2015
- Cassiopeia Manuputty, DBL All-Star 2011
- Kelvin Sanjaya, DBL All-Star 2017
- Julian Chalias, DBL All-Star 2019 & 2018
- Widyanta Putra Teja, Champion DBL 3x3 National Championship 2014
- Respati Ragil, DBL All-Star 2008
- Argus Sanyudy, Participant DBL Riau 2017
- Cliffton Wijaya, DBL All-Star 2022 & 2023 & 2024
- Muhammad Fhirdan Guntara, DBL All-Star 2014
- Radithyo Wibowo, DBL Campers 2023

== Loop 3x3 Basketball ==
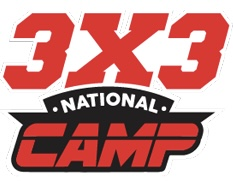
DBL 3x3 Camp

Boys

| Year | Champions | Runner up |
|---|---|---|
| 2014 | SMA IPH East Surabaya | SMA Yohanes Merauke |
| 2015 | SMAN 71 Jakarta | SMA IPH East Surabaya |
| 2016 | SMA 116 Jakarta | SMA Tri Tunggal Semarang |

Girls

| Year | Champions | Runner-up |
|---|---|---|
| 2014 | SMA Tri Tunggal Semarang | SMAK Santo Louis 1 Surabaya |
| 2015 | SMAK Diponegoro Blitar | SMA Tri Tunggal Semarang |
| 2016 | SMA IPH East Surabaya | SMA 8 Malang |

== Medal table ==
| No | Team | Gold | Silver | Total |
|---|---|---|---|---|
| 1 | SMA IPH East Surabaya | 2 | 1 | 3 |
| 2 | SMA Tri Tunggal Semarang | 1 | 2 | 3 |
| 3 | SMA 71 Jakarta | 1 | 0 | 1 |
| 4 | SMA 116 Jakarta | 1 | 0 | 1 |
| 5 | SMAK Diponegoro Blitar | 1 | 0 | 1 |
| 6 | SMAK Santo Louis 1 Surabaya | 4 | 1 | 5 |
| 7 | SMA Kr. Gloria 1 Surabaya | 4 | 1 | 5 |
| 8 | SMA Yohanes Merauke | 0 | 1 | 1 |
| 9 | SMA 8 Malang | 0 | 1 | 1 |
