= St. Louis High School =

St. Louis High School may refer to:

- St. Louis Senior High School (Ghana), Kumasi, Ashanti Region
- St Louis High School, Rathmines, Dublin, Ireland
- St. Louis Catholic High School, Lake Charles, Louisiana, US
- Saint Louis School, Honolulu, Hawaii, US
- St. Louis 1 Catholic High School Surabaya, East Java, Indonesia

== See also ==
- St. Louis University High School, St. Louis, Missouri, US
- Category:High schools in St. Louis, for other high schools in St. Louis, Missouri, US
