= Sambikerep =

Sambikerep District
- District
- Interactive map of Sambikerep District
- Country: Indonesia
- Province: East Java
- Capital: Putat Gede

Area
  - Total: 17.17 km^{2} (6.63 sq mi)

Population (mid 2024 estimate)
  - Total: 69,076
  - Density: 4,023/km^{2} (10,420/sq mi)
- Time zone: GMT +7

Sambikerep is an administrative district (kecamatan) in the city of Surabaya, East Java, Indonesia. Notable attractions include Graha Natura Park, a city park.

== Geography ==
Sambikerep is located in western part of Surabaya. It borders Wiyung and Dukuh Pakis Districts to the east, Gresik Regency to the west, Benowo, Surabaya and Tandes, Surabaya to the north, and Lakarsantri, Surabaya to the south. Some of the land is developed by Ciputra Group, also known as Citraland.

== Government ==
In 2024, the district leader (camat) is Ferdhie Ardiansyah.
