= Dukuh Pakis =

District of Surabaya, Indonesia

- District
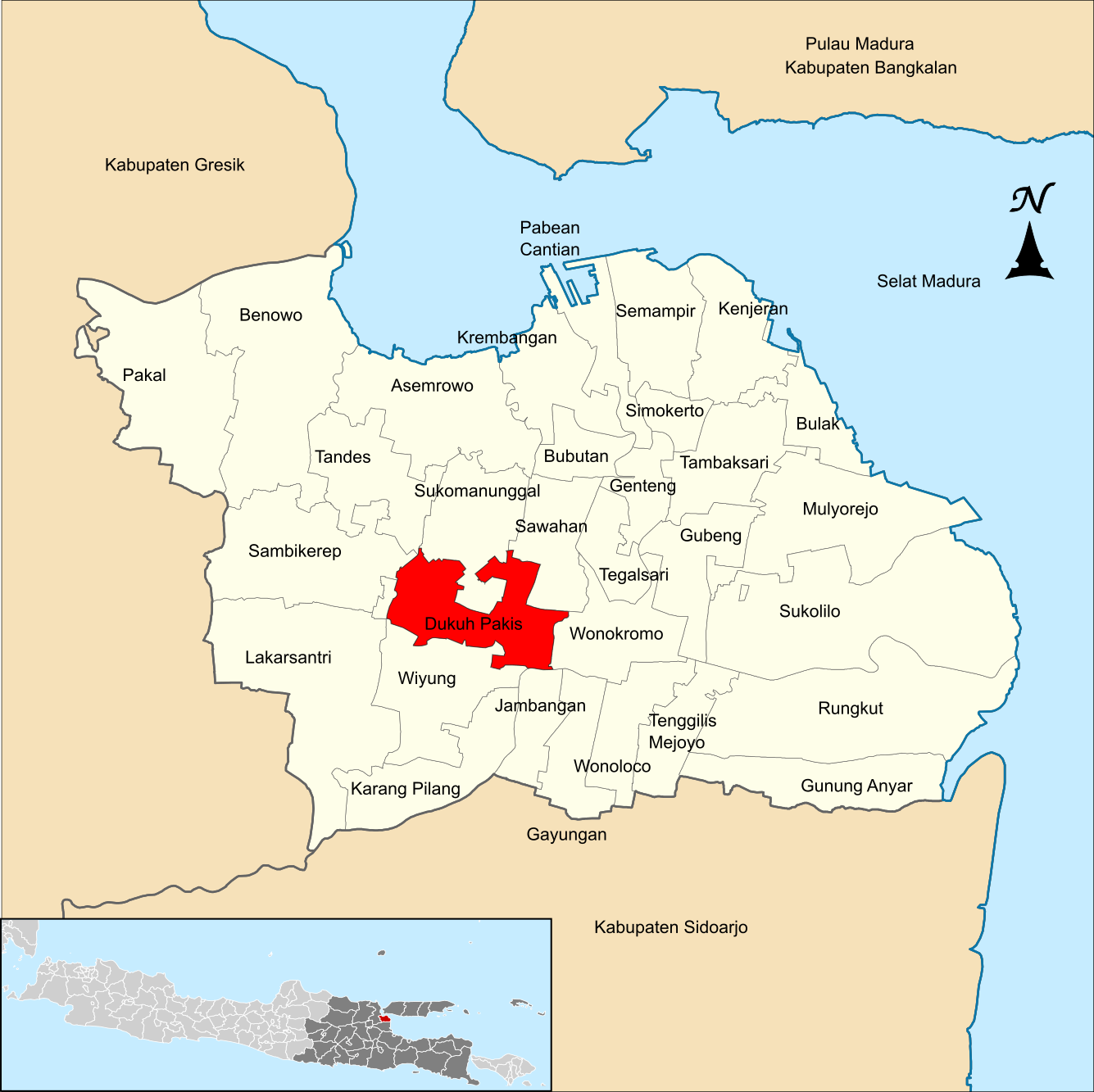

- Location within Indonesia
- Coordinates: 7°17′28″S 112°41′13″E
- Country: Indonesia
- Province: East Java
- Capital: Pradahkalikendal

Government

Area
  - Total: 10.26 km^{2} (3.96 sq mi)

Population (mid 2024 estimate)
  - Total: 59,345
  - Density: 5,784/km^{2} (14,980/sq mi)
- Time zone: GMT +7

Dukuh Pakis is an administrative district (kecamatan) of the city of Surabaya, in East Java Province of Indonesia. Located in southern Surabaya, it is divided into four urban villages (kelurahan). The name translates as "Fern District" or "Fern Hamlet" in Javanese. The district is mostly consists of residential areas, shopping malls and restaurants. Notable attractions include shopping malls like Ciputra World Surabaya, Fairway Nine and Lagoon Avenue, as well as two major golf ranges, Darmo Hills and Graha Famili. A major private research university, Wijaya Kusuma University, is also located in the district.

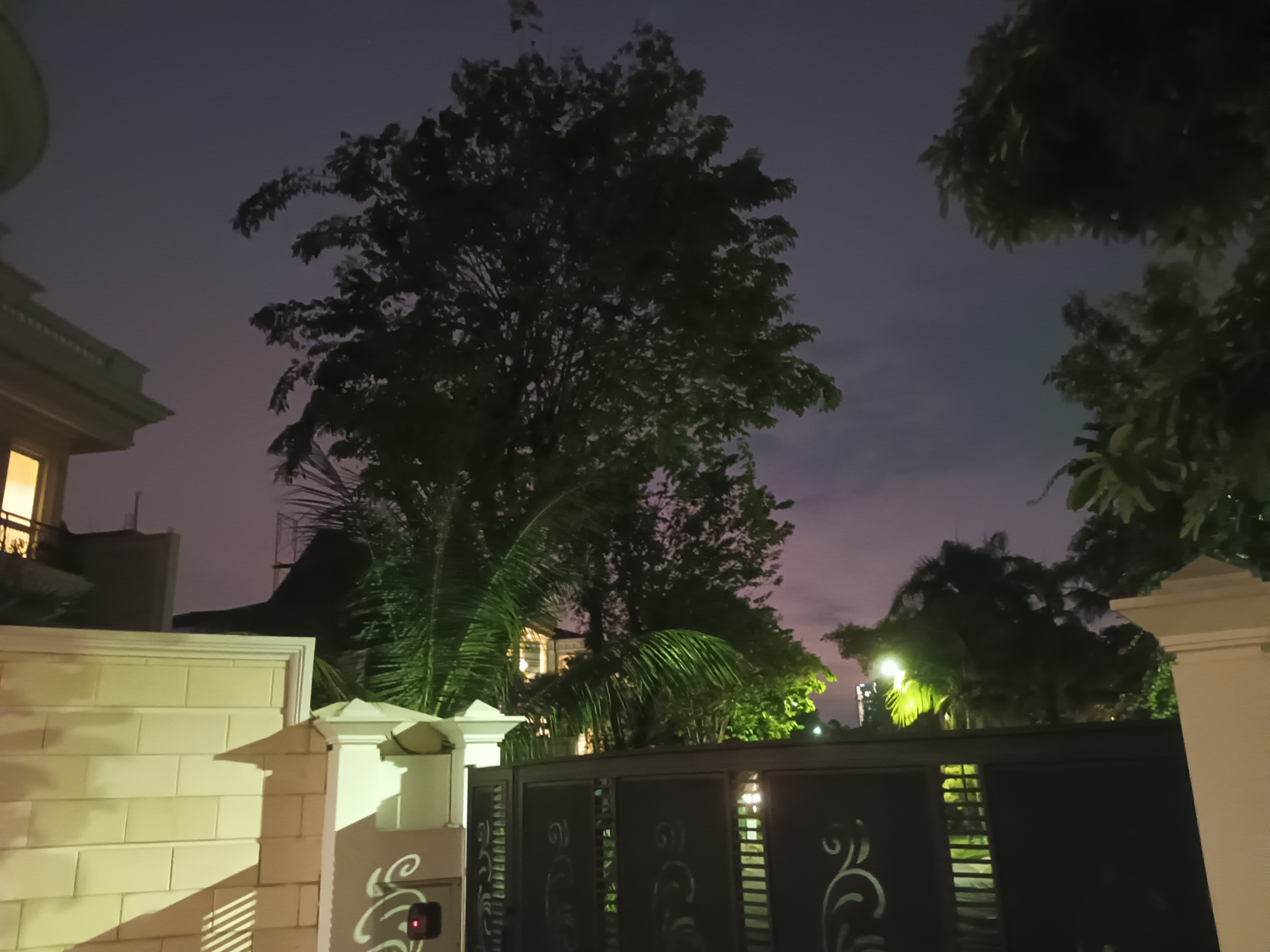
Skyline at dusk west sky

== Geography ==
Dukuh Pakis is a landlocked district bordering Sambikerep and Wiyung to the south and west. Much of it is developed by Intiland and Bukit Darmo Golf (BDG). Artificial lakes and golf venues have been made. Its postal code is 60224, with 60224 being used for Gunung Sari (Gunungsari), 60225 for Dukuh Kupang and Dukuh Pakis, and 60226 for Pradahkalikendal (Pradah Kali Kendal). Dukuh Pakis has a regional administrative code that is 35.78.21.

== Government ==
In 2024, the district leader (camat) is Hari Setyowidodo.

== Controversies ==
=== Ronald Tannur case ===
In July 2024 trials were underway about Ronald Tannur, Edward Tannur's 32-year-old son, after murdering his then-partner by colliding her while driving in Fairway Nine shopping mall in 2023. Court suggested his prison sentence to be 12 years. The judge has asked the court to have Tannur "free of all charges".
