= Auxanometer =

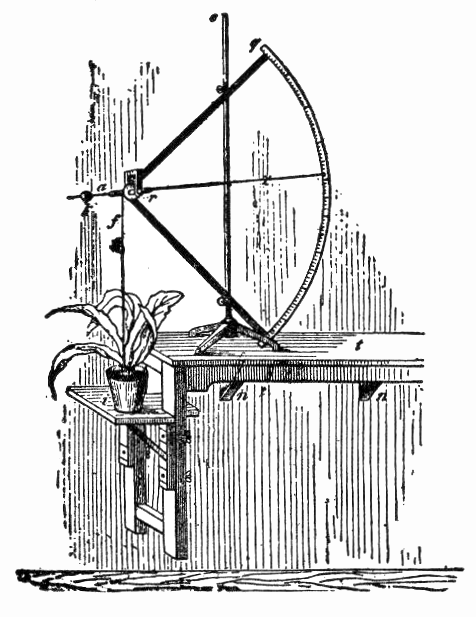
Arc Auxanometer

An auxanometer (Gr. auxain= "to grow" + metron= "measure") is an apparatus for measuring increase of growth in plants.

In case of an arc-auxanometer (see picture), there is a thin cord fixed to the plant apex on one end and a dead-weight on the other with a pointer indicating against an arc scale. In some forms it passes over a pulley which has a pointer attached to it. When the plant's height increases, the pulley rotates and the pointer moves on a circular scale to directly give the magnitude of growth. The "rate of growth" is a derived measurement obtained by dividing the length of growth measured by the auxanometer, by the time said measurement took. It is also called an arc-indicator. These simple types of auxanometer have been replaced by rotation sensors at the fulcrum point linked to dataloggers with a balancing beam attached to the growing tip/plant apex.

Sensitive auxanometers allow measurement of growth as small as a micrometer, which allows measurement of growth in response to short-term changes in atmospheric composition. Auxanometers are used in laboratory, the field, and the classroom.

== See also ==
- Crescograph
