= St. Louis 1 Catholic High School Surabaya =

Private high school in Surabaya, East Java, Indonesia

St. Louis 1 Catholic Senior High School Surabaya
- Sekolah Menengah Atas Katolik St. Louis 1 Surabaya
- Seal of St. Louis 1 Catholic High School

Location
- Jl. M. Jasin Polisi Istimewa 7 indonesia Surabaya, Indonesia, 60265
- Coordinates: 7.2803°S 112.7429°E

Information
- Type: Private Catholic Senior High School; Hogere Burgerschool (former)
- Motto: English: Be excellent in faith and knowledge
- Religious affiliation: Catholic Church
- Established: 1862; 164 years ago (as Bijzondere Europeesche Schools)
- Founder: Congregatio Fratrum a Sancto Aloysio Gonzaga
- Sister school: St Mary's School, Surabaya
- Local authority: Surabaya
- Administrator: Agustinus Berlian Kurniaji
- Head Master: Dra. Sri Wahjoeni Hadi S.
- Staff: 94 (2024-25)
- Teaching staff: 60 (2024-25)
- Employees: 34 (2024-25)
- Gender: Co-educational; Boys (former)
- Age range: 15–18
- Enrollment: 1,336 (2024-25)
- Student to teacher ratio: 22:1 (2024-25)
- Colours: Red, blue and yellow
- Song: Mars Sinlui
- Mascot: Lui
- Accreditation: A
- National ranking: 2
- Newspaper: MITREKA
- Alumni: Sinluiers
- Website: smakstlouis1sby.sch.id

St. Louis 1 Catholic High School Surabaya, known in Indonesian as Sekolah Menengah Atas Katolik St. Louis 1 Surabaya, is a private Catholic high school in Surabaya, Indonesia. It was founded in 1862 by the Congregation of Brothers of Saint Louis Gonzaga (CSA) under the name Bijzondere Europeesche Schools, making it one of the oldest school in Indonesia. St. Louis 1 is particularly well known for its history, achievements and notable alumni.

== History ==
=== Broeder School Krembangan (1862–1922) ===
On 12 July 1810, Father Hendricus Waanders and Father Philipus Wedding came from the Netherlands and settled in Surabaya, where they built a house on Jl. Gatotan to be used as a church. After Father Waanders died, pastoral care in Surabaya was handed over to the Jesuit order, where Msgr. Pierre Vrancken, the Apostolic Vicar in Batavia, succeeded in obtaining Jesuit priests for his mission in Surabaya. On 9 July 1859, Pater Vanden Elzen, SJ, and Pater Palinck, SJ, arrived in Surabaya and saw that the mission in the city would be unsuccessful without an educational institution willing to educate.

Pater Vanden Elzen tried to summon the Congregation of Brothers of Saint Louis Gonzaga (CSA) from Oudenbosch, the Netherlands to work in Surabaya and bring about single-sex education for boys, and in 1862, Vader Vincentius led by CSA Oudenbosch sent four brothers to Surabaya, namely:

- Brother Engelbert
- Brother Stanislaus
- Brother Anthony
- Brother Felix

The Catholic school was officially opened on 7 July 1862, as Bijzondere Europeesche Lagere Jongens Schools (ELS) elementary school, and started with 20 pupils. The school experienced rapid development under the leadership of Br. Engelbertus.

=== Broeder School Coen Boulevard (1923–1950) ===
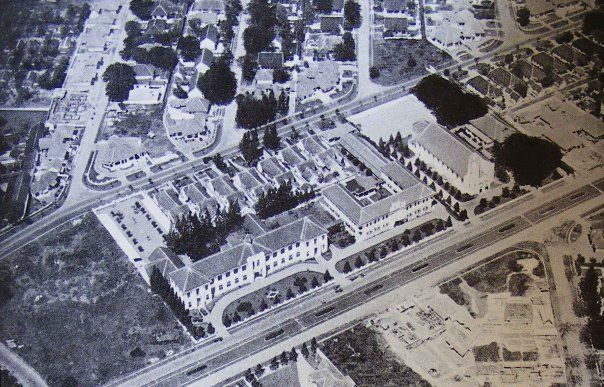
Aerial view of St. Louis School in Surabaya c. 1928

In 1923, the Congregation of Brothers of Saint Louis Gonzaga in Surabaya wishes to establish a school that refers to Dutch education system. At that time, the city of Surabaya was experiencing rapid development, which prompt the congregation to move the school outside the city of Surabaya, namely at Wonokromo, when the city boundary was still at Kaliasin. Finally, the CSA moved their school to Jl. Dokter Sutomo (formerly 7 Coen Boulevard), nowadays called (Jl. Polisi Istimewa), whereas the Ursuline Sisters moved their school to Jl. Darmo (formerly Darmo Boulevard). These Dutch school in Darmo is gender segregated, namely St. Louis for boys and St. Maria for girls. Apart from these educational facilities, these establishment is also close to the Surabaya Cathedral (Coen Kerk) and the Darmo hospital.

The Broederschool building, located at 7 Coen Boulevard, was built by Hulswit, Fermont & Ed. Cuypers from Weltevreden, Batavia. The building began to be used in 1923 as Lagere School (SD) St. Louis, and was then changed to Meer Uitgebreid Lager Onderwijs or MULO (SMP) St. Louis. In 1942, during the Japanese occupation of the Dutch East Indies, the Broederschool was used as the headquarters of the Special Police Force led by Muhammad Yasin. The Special Police forces held drills in the school yard daily and St. Louis became a silent witness to the perpetrators of the history of Indonesian independence in Surabaya and became the forerunner of the Indonesian mobile brigade.

In 1950, St. Louis school status was changed again to Hogere Burgerschool or HBS (SMA).

=== St. Louis Catholic High School (1951–1974) ===
Several years after the war, the St. Louis building that the Special Police borrowed as their headquarters was returned to the congregation so that it could be used as a school once again. After the Dutch left Indonesia, an Indonesian-language high school was opened and on 1 August 1951, one high school class was opened in one of the classrooms close to the Broeder hostel (now Soeverdi). Each year, classes continued to grow until the entire building was used for high school education.

=== St. Louis 1 Catholic Senior High School (2001–present) ===
Formerly, St. Louis 1 divided its learning activities into 2 parts, with morning classes starting at 07:00 AM – 12:30 PM for grade 10 and 12; as well as afternoon classes from 01:00 PM – 06:30 PM for grade 11. In 2004, construction began for a new building to accommodate more students, which resulted in the afternoon class ceasing to operate in 2005.

As the school develops, students achieve many achievements in the academic and non-academic fields at the national and international levels. Various improvements to school facilities were carried out so that teaching and learning activities could run comfortably and effectively. The school has its own chapel, the St. Mary chapel and its own library, the Thomas Aquino library. The school also has its own garden field; physics, biology, chemistry, and technological laboratory; dedicated school information system; as well as a football and basketball court. Wi-fi is also available throughout the school.

According to the Ministry of Education, Culture, Research, and Technology of the Republic of Indonesia, St. Louis 1 Catholic High School currently ranks 2nd nationally and 1st in the Province of East Java.

== Headmasters ==
List of St. Louis 1 Senior High School Headmasters
No.	Name	Start	End	Notes
1.	† Romo Engelbertus	1951	1953	-
2.	† Br. Rosarius	1953	1958	-
3.	† Lie Siong Thay	1958	1961	-
4.	† Br. Aquino	1961	1965	-
5.	† Br. Valerianus / Bruder Once	1965	1974	-
6.	Drs. F.X. Pur Byantara	1974	1975	-
7.	Rm. Michael Utama Purnama M.Ed., CM.	1975	1980	-
8.	Rm. V. Bieller, CM.	1980	1981	-
9.	† Hariwardjono	1981	1989	-
10.	Drs. FJ Siswanto	1989	1991	-
11.	† Drs. Djokodwihatmono	1991	2000	-
12.	† Drs. JB Soemardi	2000	2002	-
13.	Rm. Alexius Dwi Widiatna, M.Ed., CM.	2002	2012	-
14.	Rm. Drs. Canisius Sigit Tridrianto, M.Hum. CM.	2012	2016	-
15.	Dra. Indah Noor Aini, M.Pd.	2016	2020	-
16.	Dra. Sri Wahjoeni Hadi S.	2020	Incumbent	

== Achievements ==
St. Louis 1 Senior High School is particularly well known for its sports, hosting a multi-function sport hall called the bangsal, as well as an outdoor sport field. St. Louis students are also active in national and international competition, and has held the champion title for the Development Basketball League, the biggest basketball competition for Indonesian high school, for a total of 3 times, as well as 1 runner up.

St. Louis 1 has a well-established system for encouraging its pupils to produce high-standard of work, and thus, highly selective of its prospective students. This has led the school to won many awards and is considered the best school in East Java (ranked 1st) and in Indonesia (ranked 2nd). Many of its students ranked high on the Joint State Universities Selection Scheme (SBMPTN), as well as the National State Universities Selection Process (SNMPTN). The 2 are different as the Joint Selection is held by individual university, whilst the later is held by the Directorate General of Higher Education. Many of St. Louis alumni has also went to pursue their tertiary education abroad, many of whom entered prestigious universities, such as: National University of Singapore, Nanyang Technological University, Monash University, University of New South Wales, City University of Hong Kong, University of Hong Kong, etc.

Along with other Indonesian school system, St. Louis recognises the presence of OSIS (Student Union) in its jurisdiction. Extracurricular activity and clubs also exist in the school, catering for a wide range of interest, namely: Band, Basketball, Liturgical Services, Biology Science Club, Badminton, Chest, Chemistry Science Club, Cinematography, English Club, Aerobic Club, Soccer, Journalism, Catechumens, Entrepreneurship, Leadership, Mathematics Science Club, Flower Arrangements Club, Wall Magazine Club, Liturgical Music Club, Sports, and Choir.

== Notable alumni ==
Former pupils of St. Louis 1 Catholic High School are a part of St. Louis 1 Alumni Association (Ikatan Alumni SMA Katolik St. Louis 1 Surabaya).

- Ignasius Jonan, 17th Minister of Energy and Mineral Resources, 37th Minister of Transportation, CEO of Indonesian Railways Company
- Hary Tanoesoedibjo, General Chairman of the Perindo Party, President Director of MNC Asia Holding
- Hermawan Kartajaya, President of the World Marketing Association, 50 Gurus Who Have Shaped The Future of Marketing
- Seto Mulyadi, Chairman of the Indonesian Child Protection Commission
- Cheryl Gunawan, Season 9 MasterChef Indonesia winner, chef, content creator
- Olivia Tommy, Top 9 Season 8 MasterChef Indonesia, YouTuber
- Bob Tutupoly, Indonesian singer, host and actor
- Bubi Chen, Indonesian jazz musician
- Misellia Ikwan, Indonesian singer and influencer
- Patricia Devina, Indonesian actress, model and singer, spouse of Billy Davidson
- Wina Natalia, Indonesian singer
