= Perindo Party =

Centre-right political party in Indonesia

Indonesian Unity Party Partai Persatuan Indonesia
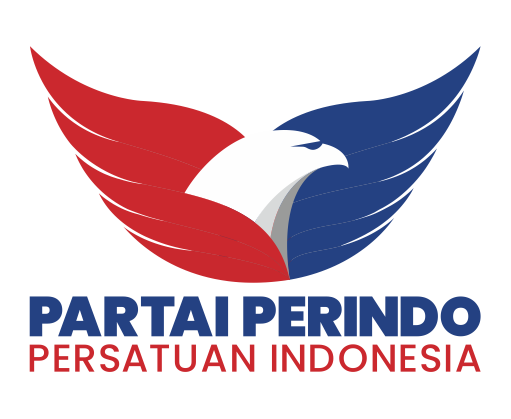
- Abbreviation: Perindo
- General Chairwoman: Angela Tanoesoedibjo
- Secretary-General: Ferry Kurnia Rizkiyansyah
- Founder: Hary Tanoesoedibjo
- Founded: 8 October 2014; 11 years ago (foundation); 7 February 2015; 11 years ago (declaration)
- Split from: People's Conscience Party
- Headquarters: Jakarta
- Youth wing: Pemuda Perindo (Perindo's Youths)
- Women's wing: Kartini Perindo (Perindo's Kartini)
- Membership (2023): 323,353
- Ideology: Pancasila; Indonesian nationalism Secularism; Populism; Protectionism
- Political position: Centre-right
- National affiliation: Advanced Indonesia Coalition (2024–present); Alliance of Parties (2023–2024); Onward Indonesia Coalition (2018–2023); Red-White Coalition (2014–2017)
- Anthem: Mars Perindo (Perindo March)
- Ballot number: 16
- DPR seats: 0 / 580
- DPRD I seats: 31 / 2,372
- DPRD II seats: 349 / 17,510

Website
- www.partaiperindo.com

The Indonesian Unity Party (Indonesian: Partai Persatuan Indonesia, Perindo) is a political party in Indonesia. The party was founded on 8 October 2014 and declared on 7 February 2015 by media tycoon Hary Tanoesoedibjo, owner of the MNC Group and business partner of current US President Donald Trump. Populist and protectionist this party sit in the centre-right position on the political spectrum.

== History ==
Hary Tanoesoedibjo established Perindo Party following his disappointing forays into politics with two other parties. In 2011, he joined the NasDem Party (Partai Nasional Demokrat) of fellow media baron Surya Paloh, but he quit the party in January 2013 after a falling out with Paloh. In February 2013, he announced he would launch a mass organization called Perindo (United Indonesia), which he hoped would eventually become a political party. In mid-2013 he joined the People's Conscience Party (Hati Nurani Rakyat, Hanura), which nominated him as the running mate of former military commander Wiranto for the 2014 presidential election, but the party was unable to field candidates after a poor showing in the 2014 general election. Hary left Hanura because he disagreed with its decision to support Joko Widodo in the 2014 presidential election. He subsequently transformed Perindo into a full political party, launched at Jakarta International Expo convention center in Kemayoran, Jakarta on 7 February 2015.

Perindo was allied with former general Prabowo Subianto's Great Indonesia Movement Party (Gerindra), which is part of the Red and White Coalition (KMP) that stands in opposition to President Joko Widodo. Hary in 2015 declared that Perindo and KMP share the same ideology "to fight for the people".

Hary has stated he may consider running for the Indonesian presidency in 2019. Under Indonesia's election rules, he will need to be nominated by a party or coalition that controls at least 20% of seats in parliament or won 25% of the popular vote in the previous general election. Perindo has said it may consider filing for a judicial review if the People's Representative Council insists on maintaining this threshold.

In 2017, Perindo declared its support for Anies Baswedan and Sandiaga Uno, who were victorious in the 19 April runoff Jakarta gubernatorial election, defeating Basuki Tjahaja Purnama. In June 2017, Hary was investigated for intimidation after allegedly sending tax investigators looking into his company's tax returns an SMS announcing that he would "cleanse" the country of undemocratic law enforcers once he had become Indonesia's leader.

For the 2019 presidential election, it declared its support for incumbent Joko Widodo. For the 2024 legislative election, the party once more failed to qualify for the national House of Representatives, though it claimed to have won seats in the local legislatures of around 60 percent of Indonesia's 514 regencies and cities. It also won the most votes in four cities and regencies, hence winning the legislature speakerships.

== Political identities ==
=== Ideology and political position ===
The 2008 Law on Political Parties mandates that all political parties in Indonesia adopt Pancasila and 1945 Constitution as their ideology and sole foundation. The party endorses protectionist policies and attributed the widening economic gap to the free market.

=== Party platform ===
Like other Indonesian secular parties, Perindo espouses values of prosperity and justice for all Indonesian citizens. The party's official vision is to make Indonesia a progressive, united, fair, affluent, prosperous, sovereign, dignified and cultured nation.

Perindo's six-point mission statement is:

1. Realizing a just government, which upholds the values of law in accordance with the 1945 Constitution.

2. Realizing a government free of corruption, collusion and nepotism for an independent and dignified Indonesia.

3. Realizing a sovereign, dignified Indonesia in order to maintain the integrity of the Unitary State of the Republic of Indonesia.

4. Creating a just, affluent and prosperous society based on Pancasila and the 1945 Constitution in the Unitary State of the Republic of Indonesia.

5. Upholding rights, human rights and supremacy of the law in which Pancasila and the 1945 Constitution to realize justice and legal certainty in order to protect the life of the people, nation and state.

6. Encouraging national economic growth that contributes directly to the welfare of Indonesian citizens.

== Leaders ==
No.	Name	Constituency / title	Term of office		Image	Election results
No.	Name	Constituency / title	Took office	Left office	Image	Election results
Split from: People's Conscience Party (Tanoesoedibjo's faction)
1	Hary Tanoesoedibjo (born 1965)	—	7 February 2015	31 July 2024		2015 Unopposed
2	Angela Tanoesoedibjo (born 1987)	Vice Minister of Tourism and Creative Economy (Note: until 20 October 2024)	31 July 2024	Incumbent		2024 Unopposed

== Election results ==
=== Presidential election results ===
Election	Ballot number	Candidate	Running mate	1st round (Total votes)	Share of votes	Outcome	2nd round (Total votes)	Share of votes	Outcome
2019	1	Joko Widodo	Ma'ruf Amin	85,607,362	55.50%	Elected			
2024	3	Ganjar Pranowo	Mahfud MD	27,040,878	16.47%	Lost			

=== Legislative election results ===
Election	Ballot number	Leader	Seats		Total votes	Share of votes	Outcome of election
Election	Ballot number	Leader	No.	±	Total votes	Share of votes	Outcome of election
2019	9	Hary Tanoesoedibjo	0 / 575		3,738,320	2.67%	Governing coalition
2024	16	Hary Tanoesoedibjo	0 / 580	0	1,955,131	1.29%	Governing coalition

Election results for Provincial Regional Houses of Representatives
Election	Province	Seats won	Status	Reference
2019	North Sumatra	1 / 100	Joint fraction with PPP and PKB	
2019	Bengkulu	2 / 45		
2019	South Sumatra	3 / 75	Joint parliamentary group with Hanura	
2019	West Java	1 / 120	Joint parliamentary group with Nasdem	
2019	East Nusa Tenggara	6 / 65	Independent parliamentary group	
2019	West Kalimantan	1 / 65		
2019	Central Kalimantan	1 / 45	Joint parliamentary group with PAN, PPP, PKS, and Hanura	
2019	North Kalimantan	1 / 35		
2019	South Sulawesi	1 / 85		
2019	West Sulawesi	3 / 45		
2019	Central Sulawesi	2 / 45		
2019	North Maluku	2 / 45		
2019	Maluku	2 / 45		
2019	West Papua	2 / 45		
2019	Papua	1 / 55		
