= Surabaya Intercultural School =

Coordinates: 7.2902111°S 112.6492583°E

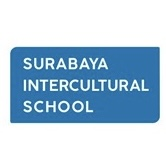
- Citraland, Surabaya; Indonesia

Information
- Type: Private, Day School
- Established: 1971
- Website: www.sis.sch.id

Surabaya Intercultural School (formerly the American Consulate School), is a non-profit, English-medium, college preparatory school in Surabaya, Indonesia for foreign students under the sponsorship of the American consulate. When the school was founded in 1971, it began operation with 24 students, including American, Japanese, Australian, German, and New Zealander students. Today, it is a pre-K through grade 12 school governed by a seven-member school board elected by the foundation consisting of parents of children of the school. The school was founded by Donna W. Randolph, wife of Robert I. Randolph, who was the American Consul in Surabaya at the time. Teachers included wives of US Consular officers, as well as Indonesian teachers.

The school is the only school in Surabaya accredited by the Western Association of Schools and Colleges. SIS graduates go on to four-year college programs in the US, Australia, Singapore or home country universities. The school staff consists of faculty and administration from eight countries. Of these staff members, 55% have advanced or graduate degrees.

Surabaya Intercultural School

== Infrastructure ==
The school opened its current campus in 1995, located in Citraland, in the west of Surabaya, about 15 kilometers (or a 30-minute drive) from the city core. The campus has 48 classrooms with teacher's offices. There are two computer labs, three science labs, demonstration rooms, "Little Theater," and a library.

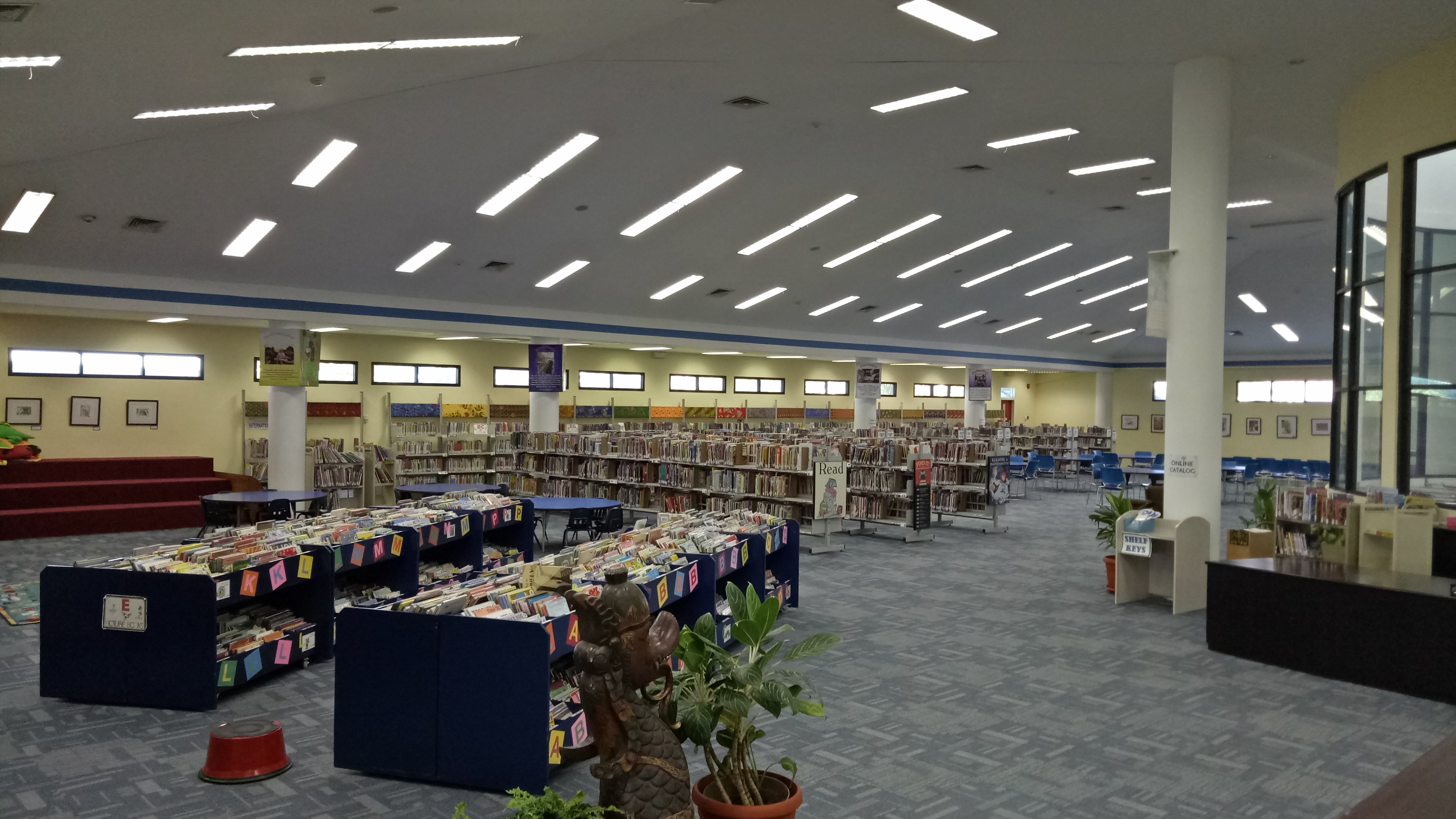
SIS library

The present campus occupies a site of 50,000 sq. meters. Facilities include two playgrounds, a full-size athletic field, an Olympic-size swimming pool, an outdoor basketball court and a multi-purpose hall that includes a stage, weight room, climbing wall and aerobics room.

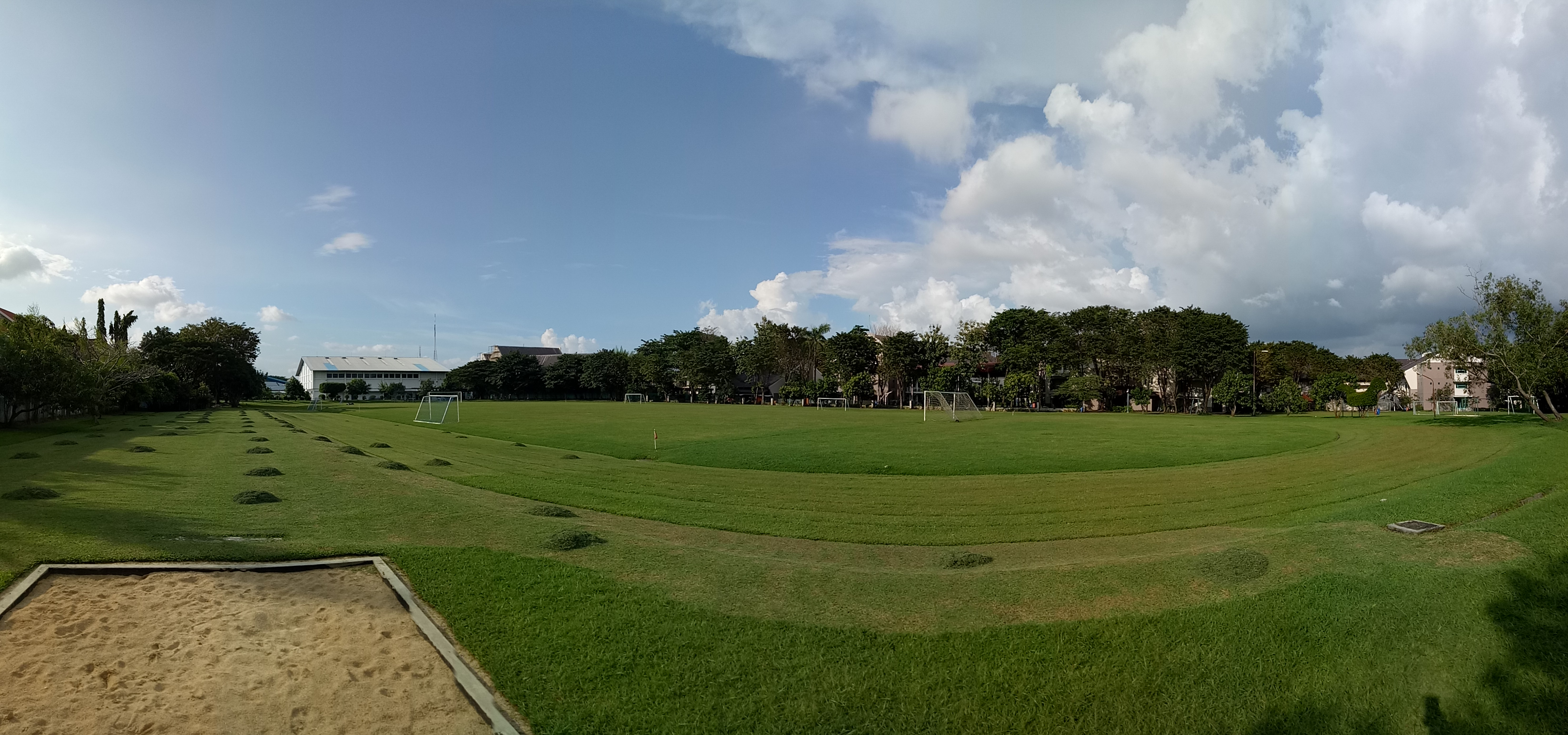
SIS soccer field

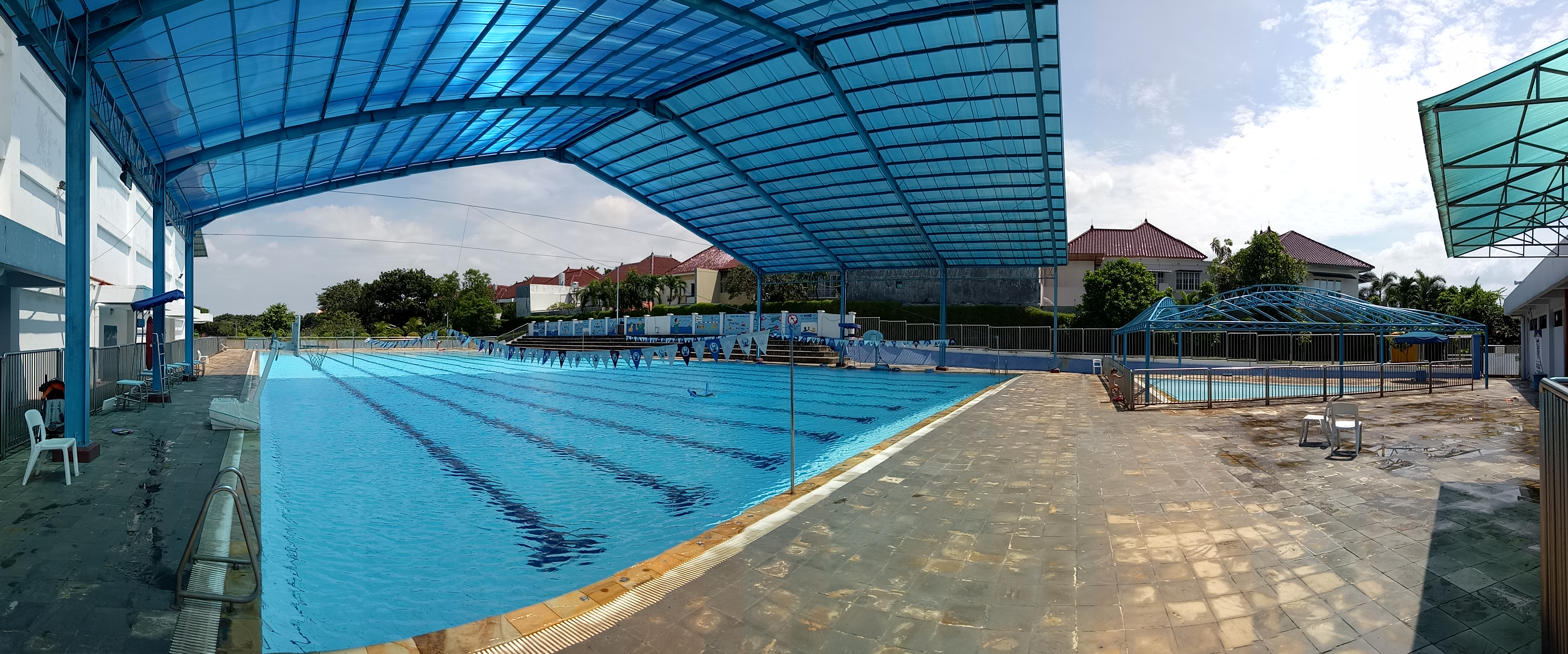
SIS pool

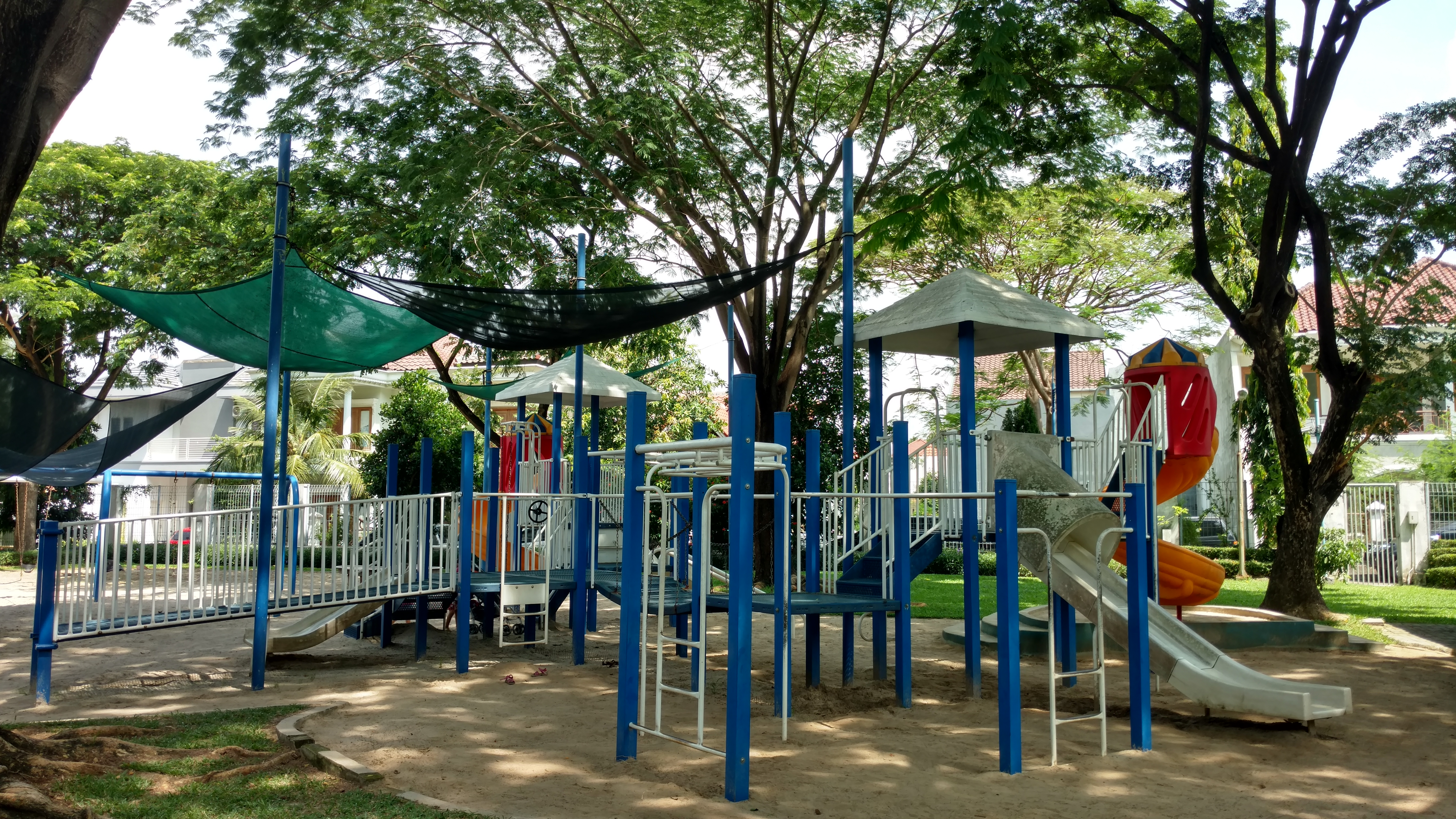
Lower Elementary Playground
