= Manado Independent School =

Location
- Parkville Estate, Parklane Kav. B1-4, Jl. Walanda Maramis, Kolongan; Manado, Indonesia; Sulawesi; Manado, Indonesia, North Sulawesi, 95371; 1°27′48.456″N 124°55′45.65″E

Information
- School type: Private international school
- Established: 2001
- Founder: Kornelius International Foundation
- Director: Billy Kumolontang, MBA.
- Principal: Vijaya Kumar Kolabathulla, PhD. (High School)
- Principal: Sharon Lintuuran, MEIL. (Middle School)
- Principal: Petra Norimarna Parera, MEd. (ECP and Elementary)
- Grades: Early Childhood through Grade 12
- Gender: Coeducational
- Age range: 2 to 18 years
- Enrolment: >1300+ students for school year 2022-2023
- Student to teacher ratio: 24:1
- Language: English, Indonesian
- Schedule: 08:00AM to 16:10PM (Middle and High); 08:00AM to 14:30PM (ECP and Lower) Monday to Friday
- Colors: Gold █, Dark Blue █, and Maroon █
- Website: https://mis-mdo.sch.id/

Manado Independent School (MIS) is a private Christian institution which provides education from Kindergarten age (K1) to Senior High School (Grade 12). MIS was the first school in the region to be granted an international school license by the National Education Department as a school of international standard (Sekolah Berstandar International). All sections of MIS are accredited by the Badan Akreditasi Sekolah Nasional of Indonesia, with "A" (excellent) classifications.

Since its establishment, students enrolled at MIS come from countries such as Australia, Sweden, the Netherlands, the Philippines, Singapore, Japan, Germany, Malaysia, Papua New Guinea, South Korea and Indonesia. All graduating students of Grade 6, 9 and 12 receive an MIS Diploma of Study from MIS International Standard exams, as well as choosing to take the National Examinations as a prerequisite to study in other Indonesian schools and universities. Several graduating students in grade 12 have been accepted into overseas universities.

As of 2015, the school has changed its name from Manado International School to Manado Independent School.

== Location ==
The school is located at Kolongan village (North Minahasa Regency, North Sulawesi Province) about 12 km. east of Manado and 30 km. west of Bitung, near residential areas as well as shopping centers and the international airport.

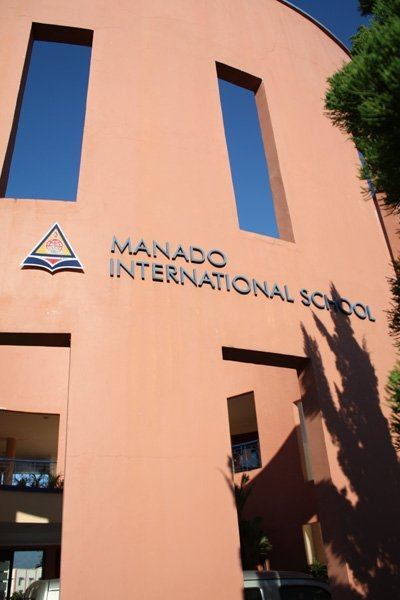

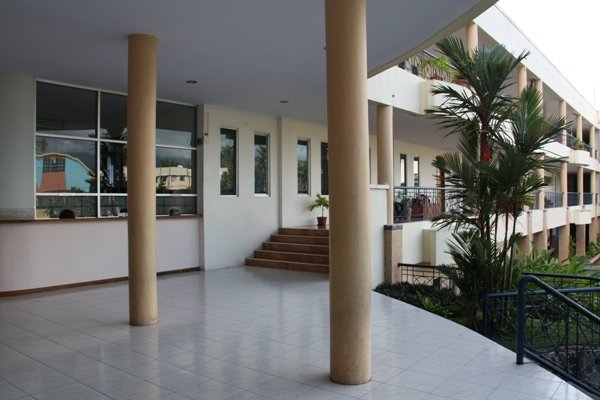
Lobby

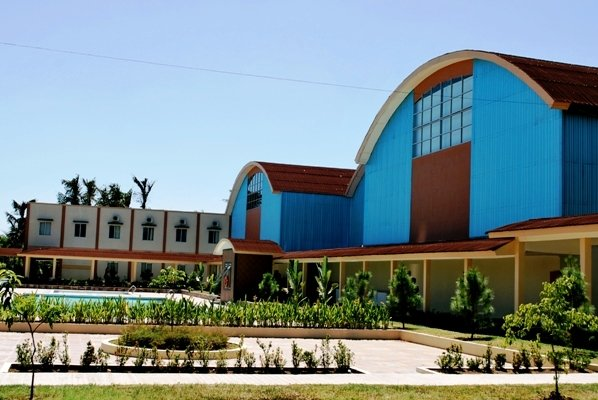
Gym and residence hall
