= Hary Tanoesoedibjo =

Indonesian businessman and politician (born 1965)

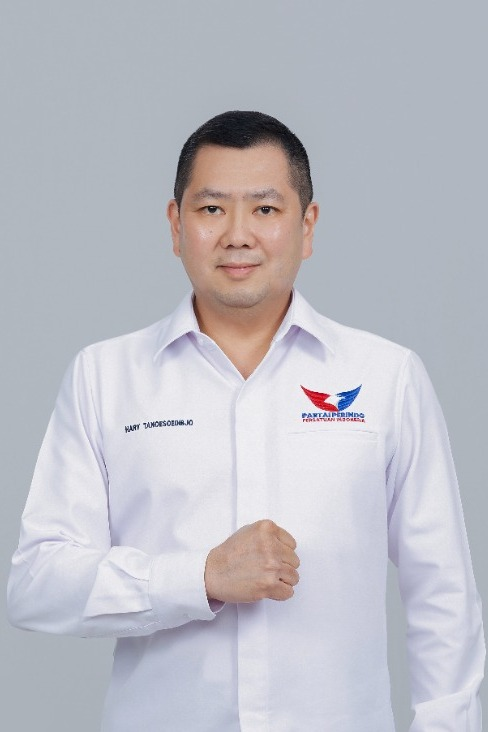

General Chairman of the Perindo Party
- In office 7 February 2015 – 31 July 2024
- Succeeded by: Angela Tanoesoedibjo

Personal details
- Born: Bambang Hary Iswanto Tanoesoedibjo; 26 September 1965 (age 60) Surabaya, Indonesia
- Party: Perindo
- Other political affiliations: Golkar (1997–2011); NasDem (2011–2013); Hanura (2013–2014)
- Spouse: Liliana Tanoesoedibjo
- Children: 5, including Angela Tanoesoedibjo
- Education: St Louis 1 School
- Alma mater: Carleton University (BCom); University of Ottawa (MBA)
- Occupation: Businessman; politician
- Known for: Chairman of MNC Group; Founder of Perindo Party

Bambang Hary Iswanto Tanoesoedibjo (born 26 September 1965), usually shortened to Hary Tanoesoedibjo or Hary Tanoe, is an Indonesian businessman and politician. He is the chairman of PT MNC Asia Holding Tbk, which he founded in 1989. As the chairman, he oversees the holding company and its subsidiaries, including Media Nusantara Citra.

He was the leader of the Perindo Party until he was succeeded by his eldest daughter, Angela Tanoesoedibjo, in 2024.

He lectures in post-graduate programs at several universities in the fields of corporate finance, investment and management strategies.

Tanoesoedibjo was listed by Forbes as the 36th richest Indonesian in 2024, with $1 billion.

He is a close friend of 45th and 47th U.S. President Donald Trump.

== Early life ==
Hary Tanoesoedibjo was born in Surabaya, East Java, Indonesia, on 26 September 1965, the son of a local businessman Achmad Tanoesoedibjo (1940–2000) and his wife, Lilek Yohana. His father was a devout Muslim and close to Abdurrahman Wahid, Indonesia's fourth President. He is the youngest of three siblings. After finishing high school, he studied at Carleton University in Canada. In 1988, he gained a bachelor's degree in Commerce, then an MBA in 1989 at the University of Ottawa. He married Liliana Tanaja Tanoesoedibjo and they have five children.

== Business career ==
In the media sector, he has served as President Director of PT Global Mediacom Tbk since 2002, President Commissioner of PT MNC Sky Vision Tbk since 2006, and as President Director of RCTI since 2010, having previously served this last position between 2003 and 2008. In the non-media sector, he serves as President Commissioner of PT MNC Kapital Indonesia Tbk since 1999, President Commissioner of PT MNC Securities since 2004, Commissioner of PT Global Transport Services since 2010, President Director of PT MNC Land Tbk since April 2011, and President Director of PT MNC Energi since 2012.

In March 2025, the first Trump golf course was opened in Jakarta, it was developed by MNC.

== Politics ==
In August 2011, Tanoesoedibjo joined the NasDem Party, which was founded by Surya Paloh. By late 2012, there were rumors of a leadership struggle between Tanoesoedibjo and Paloh. On 17 February 2013, Tanoesoedibjo quit the Nasdem Party due to his disappointment over Paloh's changes to the party's strategy. In mid-2013, Tanoesoedibjo joined the People's Conscience Party (Hati Nurani Rakyat, Hanura) led by former military commander Wiranto. Tanoesoedibjo said Hanura had a better vision and mission for Indonesia, whereas Nasdem had lost its idealism. On 2 July 2013, the Hanura Party named Wiranto and Tanoesoedibjo as its candidates for the presidency and vice presidency for Indonesia's 2014 presidential election. Hanura won only 2.86% of votes in Indonesia's 2014 general election, below the required threshold to field a presidential candidate. Hanura joined a coalition of parties backing Joko Widodo, who won the election. The decision to support Widodo prompted Tanoesoedibjo to quit from the party in May 2014, as he supported former general Prabowo Subianto for the presidency.

In 2015, Tanoesoedibjo formed his own party called Partai Perindo. As a business partner of Donald Trump, Tanoesoedibjo said he felt inspired by Donald Trump, with whom he was a business partner, to run for president of Indonesia.

Tanoesoedibjo and his wife attended the 2017 inauguration of Donald Trump and met with members of Trump's family. MNC's corporate secretary Arya Sinulingga earlier said that Tanoesoedibjo and his wife would have business meetings with Trump's two oldest sons. "He will meet his business partners ahead of the inauguration."

In 2024, Tanoesoedibjo, along with his wife and five children, ran as candidates to the House of Representatives in various electoral districts under Perindo. As Perindo failed to pass the national parliamentary threshold of 4%, none of them was elected. Tanoesoedibjo himself won 11,623 votes at Banten's 3rd electoral district.

In Monday, January 20, 2025, Hary attended the inauguration of Donald Trump as the 47th President of the United States in his second term after winning the 2024 election. Before attending the inauguration, Hary Tanoe and his family had met Trump. He shared the moment on his personal Instagram page, which featured a photo of Hary, Liliana, Warren, and Angela with Trump. Before the inauguration on January 20, 2025, Hary Tanoesoedibjo's family also appeared to have met Donald Trump in person during his visit to Trump's luxury home at the Mar-a-Lago Club, Florida, USA via his personal Instagram account last Thursday.

== Sports ==
=== Futsal ===
Tanoesoedibjo is also known for his involvement in Indonesian futsal. He was the chairman of the Indonesia Futsal Federation (FFI) from 2014 to 2024. He was first elected to the position in 2014. He was then reelected twice in 2018 and in 2022. He relinquished his position as Chairman in 2024 to Michael Sianipar after FFI extraordinary congress on 3 October 2024. He currently serves as FFI's Chairman of the Advisory Board since 2024.

== Controversy ==
In June 2017, Tanoesoedibjo was barred from leaving the country between 22 June and 12 July after allegedly sending a series of threatening text messages to Yulianto, a deputy attorney general for special crimes, who was investigating a tax restitution to telecommunications firm Mobile-8 in 2009. Tanoesoedibjo was the commissioner of the company at the time. In his book about Trump, The Big Cheat (2022), David Cay Johnston says that Tanoesoedibjo "calls himself the Trump of Indonesia" and that he "expects to become President of Indonesia in a few years". Johnston also states that "Tanoesoedibjo's MNC Group is in serious debt to the Chinese government" — another troubling similarity to the Trump organisation, and Johnston also implies that Tanoesoedibjo is as corrupt as his American role model.
