= MNC Asia Holding =

Indonesian multinational conglomerate

PT MNC Asia Holding Tbk
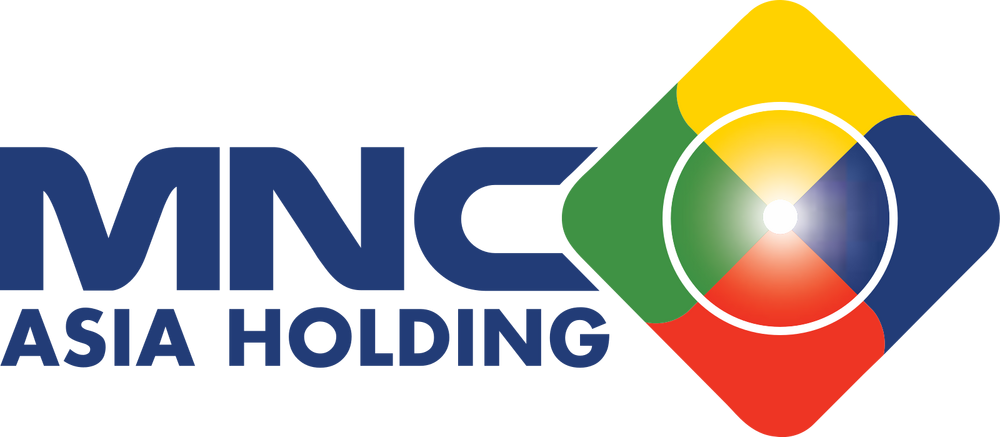
- Logo used since 2022

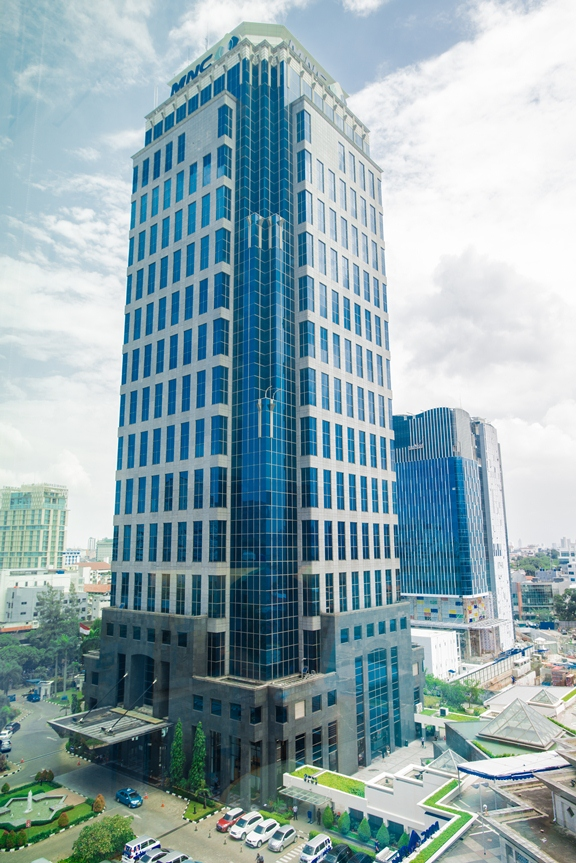
- MNC Tower in Jakarta
- Trade name: MNC Asia Holding
- Formerly: PT Bhakti Investama Tbk (1989—2013); PT MNC Investama Tbk (2013—2022)
- Company type: Public
- Traded as: IDX: BHIT
- Industry: Mineral resources; Mass media; Investment
- Founded: 2 November 1989; 36 years ago in Surabaya, East Java, Indonesia
- Founder: Hary Tanoesoedibjo
- Headquarters: Central Jakarta, Indonesia
- Key people: Hary Tanoesoedibjo (President director); Agung Firman Sampurna (The main commissioner)
- Owner: see list
- Number of employees: 9,732 (2024)
- Subsidiaries: see list
- Website: www.mncgroup.com

PT MNC Asia Holding Tbk (IDX: BHIT), a.k.a. the MNC Group, is an Indonesian conglomerate company founded in 1989. This company operates in the fields of mineral resources, mass media, and investment.

== History ==
This company was founded by Hary Tanoesoedibjo in Surabaya, East Java on 2 November 1989 as a securities company under the name PT Bhakti Investama. Three years later, in 1997, the company officially went public on the Indonesia Stock Exchange, successfully raising Rp 80 billion. After it went public, Titiek Suharto, son of then Indonesian President Suharto and Hungarian-American investor George Soros announced its holding to the company albeit for short period of time.

In early 2000s, after the end of 1997 Asian financial crisis, Tanoesoedibjo was offered by son of former President Suharto, Bambang Trihatmodjo to buy his company Bimantara Citra that was affected by the financial crisis which Tanoesoedibjo agreed to initially take 25% of the shares in which helped Tanoesoedibjo to enter the mass media industry.

== Ownership ==
The following is a list of company ownership based on financial reports as of 30 September 2024.

Shareholder Name	Percentage of Ownership (%)
HT Investment Development Ltd	15,85
DBS Bank Ltd S/A Caravaggio Holdings Limited	9,96
PT Bhakti Panjiwira	6,30
Darma Putra Wati (Deputy Chief Commissioner)	0,05
Liliana Tanaja (Commissioner)	0,11
Valencia H. Tanoesoedibjo (Commissioner)	0,00
Hary Tanoesoedibjo (President director)	3,22
Susanty Tjandra Sanusi (Deputy President Director)	0,00
Tien (Director)	0,00
Henry Suparman (Director)	0,02
Natalia Purnama (Director)	0,02
Mashudi Hamka (Director)	0,00
Santi Paramita (Director)	0,00
Public (ownership below 5%)	64,42
Total	100%

== Subsidiary ==
The following are the company's subsidiaries based on financial statements as of 30 September 2024.

Name of Subsidiary	Percentage of Ownership (%)
PT Global Mediacom Tbk	45,75
PT MNC Kapital Indonesia Tbk	50,48
PT MNC Energi	99,99
PT MNC Energy Investments Tbk	44,09
