= 2024 Indonesian presidential debate =

Election in Indonesia

The 2024 Indonesian presidential debate is a series of debates attended by three presidential candidates, Anies Baswedan, Prabowo Subianto, and Ganjar Pranowo, as well as their vice-presidential candidates in 2024 Indonesian presidential election.

== Background ==
During the time frame established by the General Election Commission (KPU), presidential and vice presidential candidates use debates as a campaign tactic. Five debates between presidential and vice-presidential pairings was place throughout the campaign season in compliance with the Indonesian electoral law of 2017. While all three pairs of candidates will participate together in each debate, the KPU has planned three debates for presidential candidates and two for vice presidential candidates for the 2024 elections. In contrast, during the 2019 election campaign, there were two special debates for presidential candidates, one for the vice president, and two for presidential-vice-presidential couples. This format modification was seen advantageous for some pairings, and it became a topic of discussion among the public and the success teams of candidate pairs.

Compared to the debates held throughout the 2019 election campaign, the format of each debate's segments has not altered much. The discussion will be broken up into six sections, with a total duration of around 120 minutes. Following the presentation of the candidate couples' mission and vision in the first segment, there will follow two question and answer sessions aimed at refining the vision and mission through prepared panelist questions. The presidential candidates exchange questions and answers in the following two segments, and the sixth section concludes with a closing statement.

== Schedule ==
| No. | Day and Date | Location | Theme | Panelist(s) | Moderator(s) | Broadcaster (Official) | Debate Participant(s) | | | | | |
| P Participant(s) N Nonparticipant(s) | | | | | | | Candidates 1 | | Candidates 2 | | Candidates 3 | |
| P Participant(s) N Nonparticipant(s) | | | | | | | Anies Baswedan | Muhaimin Iskandar | Prabowo Subianto | Gibran Rakabuming | Ganjar Pranowo | Mahfud MD |
|---|---|---|---|---|---|---|---|---|---|---|---|---|
| 1 | Tueasday, December 12, 2023 | KPU RI Office | Governance; Law; Human Rights; Eradication of corruption; Democracy enhencement; Public service improvement; Handling disinformation; Citizen harmony | Mada Sukmajati; Rudi Rohi; Lita Tyesta; Khairul Fahmi; Agus Riewanto; Susi Dwi Harijanti; Bayu Dwi Anggono; Ahmad Taufan Damanik; Al Makin; Gun Gun Heryanto; Wawan Mas'udi | Ardianto Wijaya Valerina Daniel | TVRI; RRI | P | N | P | N | P | N |
| 2 | Friday, December 22, 2023 | Jakarta Convention Center | Economy; People's economy; Digital economy; Finance; Tax investment; Trade; State budget and local budget management; Infrastructure and cities | Alamsyah Saragih; Adhitya Wardhono; Agustinus Prasetyantoko; Fauzan Ali Rasyid; Hendri Saparini; Hyronimus Rowa; Poppy Ismalina; Retno Agustina Ekaputri; Suharnomo; Tauhid Ahmad; Yosa Rizal Damuri | Alfito Deannova Liviana Cherlisa | Trans TV; Trans7; CNN Indonesia; CNBC Indonesia; Kompas TV; BTV; IDTV | N | P | N | P | N | P |
| 3 | Sunday, January 7, 2024 | Istora Gelora Bung Karno | Defense; Security; International relations; Globalization; Geopolitics; Overseas politics | Angel Damayanti; Curie Maharani Savitri; Evi Fitriani; Hikmahanto Juwana; I Made Andi Arsana; Ian Montratama; Irine Hiraswari Gayatri; Kusnanto Anggoro; Marsetio; Philips J. Vermonte; Widya Setiabudi Sumadinata | Anisha Dasuki Ariyo Ardi | RCTI; MNCTV; GTV; iNews; Garuda TV | P | N | P | N | P | N |
| 4 | Sunday, January 21, 2024 | Jakarta Convention Center | Sustainable development; Natural resources; Environment; Energy; Food; Agraria; Indigenous peoples and villages | Abrar Saleng; Arie Sujito; Arif Satria; Dewi Kartika; Fabby Tumiwa; Hariadi Kartodihardjo; Ridwan Yahya; Rukka Sombolinggi; Sudharto P. Hadi; Sulistyowati Irianto; Tubagus Furqon Sofhani | Retno Pinasti Zilvia Iskandar | SCTV; Indosiar; Moji; MetroTV; Magna Channel; BN Channel | N | P | N | P | N | P |
| 5 | Sunday, February 4, 2024 | Jakarta Convention Center (Note: sebelumnya direncanakan di Kantor KPU RI) | Social welfare; Culture; Education; Information technology; Health; Employment; Human resources, and inclusion | Aminuddin Syam; Asep Saepudin Jahar; Bahruddin; Damar Juniarto; PM Laksono; Imam Prasodjo; Onno Widodo Purbo; Reni Kusumowardhani; Timboel Siregar; Tolhas Damanik; Tukiman Tarunasayoga; Vina Andriany | Andromeda Mercury Dwi Anggia | antv; tvOne; VTV; NET. | P | N | P | N | P | N |

=== Broadcasting (via television) ===
| No. | Day and date | Broadcaster (Television) | | Ref |
| No. | Day and date | Official | Live | Ref |
|---|---|---|---|---|
| 1 | Tuesday, December 12, 2023 | TVRI (live); TVRI Daerah (live, from TVRI); TVRI World (live, from TVRI); RRI NET (live, from TVRI) | RTV (suspend); Sin Po TV (live); Moji (suspend, from SCTV); NET. (suspend); Sindonews TV (live, from iNews); TvMu (live); Jak TV (live); Nusantara TV (live); JPM TV (live); CNN Indonesia (live); CNBC Indonesia (live); IDTV (live, from BTV); BTV (live); SCTV (live); Indosiar (live); tvOne (live); GTV (suspend, from iNews); Magna Channel (live, from MetroTV); RCTI (live, from iNews); MetroTV (live); Kompas TV (live); iNews (live); Garuda TV (live); BN Channel (live, from MetroTV); antv (live); Jawa Pos TV (live) | |
| 2 | Friday, December 22, 2023 | Trans TV (live, from CNN Indonesia); Trans7 (live, from CNN Indonesia); CNN Indonesia (live); CNBC Indonesia (live); Kompas TV (live); BTV (live); IDTV (live, from BTV) | TvMu (live); TVRI World (live, from TVRI); TVRI Daerah (live, from TVRI); Garuda TV (live); Jak TV (live); Nusantara TV (live); Sin Po TV (live); RCTI (live, from iNews); JPM TV (live); Indosiar (live); RRI NET (live); Jawa Pos TV (live); MetroTV (live); antv (live); SEA Today (live); NET. (suspend); RTV (suspend); iNews (live); JTV (live); TVRI (live); Magna Channel (live, from MetroTV); Kompas TV (live); tvOne (live); Sindonews TV (live, from iNews); SCTV (live) | |
| 3 | Sunday, January 7, 2024 | RCTI (live, from iNews); MNCTV (suspend, f romiNews); GTV (suspend, from iNews); iNews (live); Garuda TV (live) | BTV (live); TvMu (live); Kompas TV (live); Nusantara TV (live); IDTV (live, from BTV); JPM TV (live); TVRI World (live, from TVRI); Magna Channel (live, from MetroTV); RRI NET (live); Sindonews TV (live, from iNews); antv (live); RTV (suspend); NET. (suspend); CNN Indonesia (live); TVRI Daerah (live, from TVRI); JTV (live); TVRI (live); MetroTV (live); Indosiar (live); SCTV (live); Sin Po TV (live); tvOne (live); CNBC Indonesia (live); SEA Today (live); Jak TV (live) | |
| 4 | Sunday, January 21, 2024 | SCTV (live); Indosiar (live); Moji (suspend, from SCTV); MetroTV (live); Magna Channel (live, from MetroTV); BN Channel (live, from MetroTV) | TVRI (live); TVRI Daerah (live, dari TVRI); TVRI World (live, from TVRI); JPM TV (live); TvMu (live); RRI NET (live); SEA Today (live); JTV (live); IDTV (live, from BTV); BTV (live); antv (live); tvOne (live); RCTI (live, from iNews); iNews (live); Kompas TV (live); Garuda TV (live); Nusantara TV (live); Sin Po TV (live); Trans TV (live, from CNN Indonesia); CNN Indonesia (live); CNBC Indonesia (live); NET. (suspend); Sindonews TV (live, from iNews); RTV (suspend); Jak TV (live) | |
| 5 | Sunday, February 4, 2024 | antv (live); tvOne (live); VTV; NET. (live) | TVRI (live); TVRI Daerah (live, from TVRI); TVRI World (live, from TVRI); RRI NET (live); RCTI (live, from iNews); iNews (live); Sindonews TV (live, from iNews); Trans TV (live, form CNN Indonesia); Trans7 (live, from CNN Indonesia); CNN Indonesia (live); CNBC Indonesia (live); Kompas TV (live); SCTV (live); Indosiar (live); MetroTV (live); Magna Channel (live, from MetroTV); JTV (live); JPM TV (live); RTV (suspend); Nusantara TV (live); Garuda TV (live); Sin Po TV (live); BTV (live); IDTV (live, from BTV); Jak TV (live); TvMu (live); SEA Today (live) | |

== First debate ==
2024 Indonesian Presidential Election Debate

First debate
- Host: KPU RI
- Date(s): December 12, 2023
- Duration: 150 minutes
- Venue: KPU RI Official, Jakarta
- Footage: KPU RI; TVRI; RRI
- Moderator(s): Ardianto Wijaya; Valerina Daniel
- Transcript: Transkrip.id; Meemo
- Fact checking: CNN Indonesia; Tirto.id

On December 12, 2023, the first debate between presidential candidates was held at the KPU RI Office in Jakarta. In keeping with the idea of a town hall meeting discussion, this debate introduced the three presidential candidate pairs participating in the 2024 election, although in actually just the three presidential candidates participated. The themes of the debate were Government, Law, Human Rights, Corruption Eradication, Strengthening Democracy, Improving Public Services, and Harmony among Citizens. TVRI anchors, Ardianto Wijaya and Valerina Daniel were appointed as moderators at the premiere of this debate.

The first debate presented the three presidential candidates debating law, bureaucracy, and democratic system. Anies and Muhaimin appeared compactly wearing white shirts with black suits with stickers “AMIN” on their chests, Prabowo wore a light blue shirt as their partner's signature color matching with his partner Gibran and there was a small pin pinned on his chest, Ganjar appeared wearing a white shirt that read “sat, set”, while Mahfud who wore a white shirt that read “tas, tes” with a picture of a judicial scale on his left chest. Anies and Prabowo clashed during the democracy debate. Anies stated that there were still restrictions on freedom of speech. Prabowo responded by dismissing the issue. He insisted that democracy under Jokowi's administration was good, even according to him, it was because of the democratic process that Anies could become governor of Jakarta. Anies replied that Prabowo was considered “unable to stand to be in the opposition camp” as an honorable position.

== Second debate ==
2024 Indonesian Vice-Presidential Election Debate

Second debate
- Host: KPU RI
- Date(s): December 22, 2023
- Duration: 150 minutes
- Venue: Jakarta Convention Center, Jakarta
- Footage: KPU RI; CNN Indonesia; Kompas TV; BTV
- Moderator(s): Alfito Deannova; Liviana Cherlisa
- Transcript: Transkrip.id; Meemo
- Fact checking: CNN Indonesia; Tirto.id; Kompas.com

The second presidential and vice presidential debate took place on December 22, 2023, at the Jakarta Convention Center, Jakarta. With a modified town-hall meeting concept, this debate will be followed by the vice-presidential candidates with a discussion format similar to the previous debate. The themes of this debate are Economy, People's Economy, Digital Economy, Finance, Tax Investment, Trade, Management of State Budget and Regional Budget, Infrastructure and Cities. Detik.com editor-in-chief and CNN Indonesia host Alfito Deannova and Kompas TV host Liviana Cherlisa were appointed as moderators for the second debate.

Indonesian Presidential and Vice-Presidential Candidates number 1 Anies Baswedan and Muhaimin Iskandar were dressed in the same attire as the first debate, which was white shirts with black suits. They also wore accessories, including pins labeled AMIN and kopiah. Likewise, candidate pair number 2 Prabowo Subianto and Gibran Rakabuming Raka who appeared in the same outfit from the first debate, a blue shirt typical of their partner's color. Gibran rolled up his sleeves to around the elbow, while Prabowo left his sleeves up to his wrist. Also, candidate number 3 Ganjar Pranowo and Mahfud MD came dressed in traditional Indonesian attire. Mahfud wore a traditional Madurese traditional outfit from East Java province, while Ganjar was also dressed in a traditional Rote outfit from East Nusa Tenggara province. In addition, their supporters also came wearing traditional clothing from different regions throughout Indonesia to watch the second debate in person. This time the debate was between vice presidential candidates Muhaimin Iskandar, Gibran Rakabuming Raka and Mahfud MD. In this second debate, the vice-presidential candidates debated on the big topic of economic issues. In the middle of the debate, Gibran Rakabuming Raka asked questions about abbreviations that other candidate did not understand, so the KPU issued a rule in the next debate, participants are prohibited using questions containing terms, abbreviations or acronyms that are not common and not understood by other participants unless they explain it first.

== Third debate ==
2024 Indonesian Presidential Election Debate

Third debate
- Host: KPU RI
- Date(s): January 7, 2024
- Duration: 150 minutes
- Venue: Istora Senayan, Jakarta
- Footage: KPU RI; RCTI iNews; Garuda TV
- Moderator(s): Ariyo Ardi; Anisha Dasuki
- Transcript: Meemo
- Fact checking: CNN Indonesia; Tirto.id; Kompas.com; Narasi Newsroom

The third presidential and vice-presidential debate took place on January 7, 2024, at Istora Senayan, Jakarta. Using a modified town-hall meeting concept, this debate will be followed by presidential candidates with a discussion format similar to the previous debate. The theme of this debate is Defense, Security, International, Globalization, Geopolitics and Foreign Policy. GTV editor-in-chief who previously hosted RCTI Ariyo Ardi, and iNews anchor Anisha Dasuki were appointed as moderators for the third debate.

In the third debate, Indonesian Presidential and Vice Presidential candidates number 1 Anies Baswedan and Muhaimin Iskandar consistently showed their formal appearances wearing black suits and white shirts. Unlike the second debate, Anies and Muhaimin appeared without wearing caps. Indonesian Presidential and Vice Presidential Candidate pair number 2 Prabowo Subianto and Gibran Rakabuming Raka still appeared in light blue shirts, which became their characteristic. The appearance difference was brought by Gibran who layered his shirt with dark blue outerwear and sneakers to complete his look. While Prabowo appeared more formal wearing loafers. Indonesian Presidential and Vice Presidential candidate pair number 3 Ganjar Pranowo and Mahfud MD came wearing jackets like in the movie Top Gun, which they named “Top Gan”, a green bomber jacket equipped with patches of their favorite slogans “tas tes” and “sat set”, serial number “3”, as well as various programs such as “Progressive Geopilitics”, “Free College for Children of Soldiers and Bhayangkara”, to “Modernization of Sakti Defense.” Under the jacket, they used a white shirt coupled with an accessory of a red tie and appeared wearing aviator glasses when entered the arena.

The third debate was between presidential candidates Anies Baswedan, Prabowo Subianto, and Ganjar Pranowo. The third debate was quite heated, with Anies Baswedan and Ganjar Pranowo asking Prabowo Subianto to disclose data on defense. Both of them demanded Prabowo's transparency while still serving as Minister of Defense. Moreover, Prabowo's performance as Minister of Defense was also considered poor on that occasion. The third presidential debate was even more hotly discussed when the three candidates used data to attack each other. Even President Joko Widodo also commented on the debate. Jokowi assessed that the third debate was more focused on attacking each other between presidential candidates. According to him, it doesn't matter if there is mutual attack, as long as it is still about vision and policy, not attacking personally.

== Fourth debate ==
2024 Indonesian Vice-Presidential Election Debate

Fourth debate
- Host: KPU RI
- Date(s): January 21, 2024
- Duration: 150 minutes
- Venue: Jakarta Convention Center, Jakarta
- Footage: KPU RI; SCTV; MetroTV
- Moderator(s): Retno Pinasti; Zilvia Iskandar
- Transcript: Kumparan.com; Meemo
- Fact checking: CNN Indonesia; Tirto.id; Kompas.com; Narasi Newsroom

The fourth presidential and vice presidential debate took place on January 21, 2024, at the Jakarta Convention Center, Jakarta. Taking the concept of a modified town-hall meeting, this debate participated by the vice presidential candidates with a discussion format similar to the previous debates. The themes of this debate are Sustainable Development, Natural Resources, Environment, Energy, Food, Agrarian, and Indigenous Peoples and Villages. In previous debates, the moderators were paired with a man and a woman, however on this debate, two women from SCTV's Liputan 6 editor-in-chief Retno Pinasti and MetroTV's news anchor Zilvia Iskandar were appointed as moderators on the fourth debate.

Candidates number 1 Anies Baswedan and Muhaimin Iskandar came with white shirts without a black suit. Candidate pair number 2 Prabowo Subianto and Gibran Rakabuming Raka compactly wore the same light blue shirt typical of their pair's colors, Prabowo was seen layering his light blue shirt with a dark blue suit. Meanwhile, Gibran was seen wearing a blue shirt with an image similar to the Straw Hat “One Piece” group flag on his left chest. Candidate pair number 3 Ganjar Pranowo and Mahfud MD were present wearing mountain people costumes specifically designed and tailored to the environmental theme. In the early session, Ganjar-Mahfud wore a green long-sleeved shirt complete with a cream-colored scraft, and the slogan Sat Set on the left chest and Number 3 on the right chest. During the press conference, Ganjar-Mahfud wore a green shirt combined with a vest with the Sat-Set slogan on the left chest, and Number 3 on the right chest. The debate was between vice-presidential candidates Muhaimin Iskandar, Gibran Rakabuming Raka and Mahfud MD.

In this fourth debate, the vice-presidential candidates attacked each other about food estate, nickel downstreaming to the seizure of indigenous areas, from the revocation of mining IUPs with many mafias, nickel, lithium-ion and lithium phosphate, carbon tax and renewable energy, agrarian reform, village development, community customary rights and others. Moreover, the interesting part of the fourth debate was Thomas Lembong's name mentioned by Gibran in response to Muhaimin's note, and the term “Greenflation” when Gibran asked Mahfud MD, and Gibran's gimmick to find answers from Mahfud MD.

== Fifth debate ==
2024 Indonesian Presidential Election Debate

Fifth debate
- Host: KPU RI
- Date(s): February 4, 2024
- Duration: 150 minutes
- Venue: Jakarta Convention Center, Jakarta
- Footage: KPU RI tvOne; NET TV
- Moderator(s): Andromeda Mercury; Dwi Anggia
- Fact checking: CNN Indonesia; Tirto.id; Kompas.com; Narasi Newsroom

The fifth presidential and vice presidential candidate debate took place on February 4, 2024, at the Jakarta Convention Center, Jakarta. This debate is the final debate of Indonesia's 2024 Presidential and Vice Presidential Candidate Debates. Using a modified town-hall meeting concept, this debate will be followed by presidential candidates with a discussion format similar to the previous debate. The themes of this debate are social welfare, culture, education, information technology, health, employment, human resources and inclusion. tvOne Executive Producer, Dwi Anggia, and tvOne news anchor, Andromeda Mercury were appointed as moderators for the final debate.

In the fifth debate, Candidate number 1 Anies Baswedan and Muhaimin Iskandar brought the theme “Presidential Look” where the pair wore white shirts, black suits complete with blue and maroon ties, black pants, also black skullcaps. Supporters were also present at the debate location wearing matching uniforms. Presidential and Vice Presidential Candidate pair number 2 Prabowo Subianto and Gibran Rakabuming Raka appeared in jackets dominated by sky blue and white colors, that covered light blue shirts. Meanwhile, candidate pair number 3 Ganjar Pranowo and Mahfud MD appeared wearing student-style varsity jackets with a combination of black and white colors. On their jackets, there were a number of emblems and embroidered containing 21 of their flagship programs, along with the words “sat set” and “tas tes” on their jackets.

The fifth debate as the final debate was a debate between presidential candidates Anies Baswedan, Prabowo Subianto, and Ganjar Pranowo. This debate was cool and gentle without intense debates between the candidates. For example, Prabowo agreed several times with the opinions of his debate opponent Anies Baswedan. First, Prabowo agreed with Anies' idea about the importance of giving a wide space for culturalists to express themselves and then the issue of improving the welfare of teachers. Prabowo understood that Anies was a former Minister of Education and Culture (Mendikbud). In addition, Ganjar and Anies talked about the importance of strengthening data on people with disabilities, Prabowo again agreed with their input about strengthening data on people with disabilities. Meanwhile, Ganjar's debate style occasionally insinuated and attacked. He insinuated the resignation of his vice president Mahfud MD, who considered that state officials should set an example by resigning when they wanted to participate in practical political contestation. Ganjar also launched an attack on Prabowo when he asked about the free meal program for stunting in children, Ganjar replied that he did not agree. He explained that the prevention of stunting for stunted children was considered too late and should not allow excessive feeding of children to cause obesity. Prabowo responded again to Ganjar's statement that what he was asking was exactly what Ganjar had said. However, Ganjar again replied that Prabowo corrected his own question. Because the fifth debate was the last debate, the closing statements of the candidates were usually only 2 minutes, in this fifth debate each presidential candidate was given 4 minutes for closing statements.
