= Indy Rahmawati =

Indonesian news anchor and producer

- Born: Indy R Rahmawati; April 1, 1971 (age 55); Bandung, West Java, Indonesia
- Occupation: Journalist
- Years active: 1996–present
- Spouse: Tedy Sadeli

Indy R Rahmawati (born April 1, 1971) is an Indonesian news anchor and producer in TvOne. She was born in Bandung and began her television career in 1999. Rahmawati started her career as a journalist with SCTV in 1999 to 2006 before moving to antv in 2006 to 2008, and continued her career as a presenter with TvOne in 2008 to present.
