= Cinta di dalam Perjodohan =

Indonesian drama television series

- Genre: Melodrama; Romance
- Created by: Titin Suryani
- Written by: Team Verona
- Directed by: Dinesh S. Samby
- Starring: Angelica Simperler; Bryan Andrew; Rendy Septino; Jacob Kai Yusuf; Zora Vidyanata; Ali Seggaf
- Theme music composer: Ungu
- Opening theme: "Cinta Dalam Hati" by Ungu
- Ending theme: "Cinta Dalam Hati" by Ungu
- Composer: Ary Logam
- Country of origin: Indonesia
- Original language: Indonesian
- No. of seasons: 1
- No. of episodes: 63

Production
- Executive producer: Titin Suryani
- Producer: Titin Suryani
- Production locations: Jakarta, Indonesia
- Cinematography: Mame Shulla
- Editor: Cutting Point Post
- Camera setup: Multi-camera
- Running time: 120 minutes
- Production company: Verona Pictures

Original release
- Network: ANTV
- Release: 15 November 2021 – 16 January 2022

Cinta di dalam Perjodohan is an Indonesian television series that premiered on 15 November 2021 to 16 January 2022 on ANTV. The series is produced by Verona Pictures and stars Angelica Simperler, Bryan Andrew and Rendy Septino.

== Plot ==
Gio and Nayla, who do not know each other are in an arranged marriage by their parents. But a tragedy makes their parents die. Gio and Nayla must meet and take care of each other according to their parents' last mandate and uncover the mystery of their patents death.

== Cast ==
=== Main ===
- Angelica Simperler as Nayla Aryaseta: Fatir and Sarah's daughter; Gio's ex-wife; Azka's wife. (2021–2022)
- Bryan Andrew as Gerald Abimanyu: Adriyanto and Tamara's son; Nayla's ex-husband. (2021–2022)
- Rendy Septino as Azka: Hendra's adopted son; Nayla's husband. (2021–2022)
- Jacob Kai Yusuf as Devan Abimanyu: Adriyanto Abimanyu and first ex wife son; Nayla Fiance and Wilona admire. (2021)

=== Recurring ===
- Tamee Irelly as Wilona (2021–2022)
- Tiwi Pratiwi as Prita (2021–2022)
- Ali Seggaf as Miko (2021–2022)
- Kea Macleod as Chris (2021–2022)
- Jennifer Fonnesbech Tvermoes as Kikan (2021–2022)
- Kaemita Boediono as Tamara Abimanyu: Adriyanto's wife; Gio's mother. (2021–2022)
- Pierre Gruno as Hendra: Azka's adopted Father. (2021–2022)
- Zora Vidyanata as Renata (2021–2022)
- Neezha Rais as Tere (2021–2022)
- Alfian Phang as Edwin (2021–2022)
- Jerio Jeffry as Fatir: Sarah's ex-husband; Nayla's father. (2021–2022)
- Dicky Andryanto as Jimmy (2021–2022)
- Daniel Leo as Adriyanto Abimanyu: Tamara's husband; Gio's father. (dead) (2021)

== Productions ==
=== Development and premiere ===
The first promo of this soap opera was released on 4 November 2021. This series premiered on 15 November 2022.

=== Casting ===
Angelica Simperler was selected to play Nayla Aryaseta. Bryan Andrew was chosen to play Gerald Abimanyu. and Rendy Septino was selected to portray the role of Azka.
