= JTV (Indonesian TV channel) =

Private TV channel in East Java, Indonesia

- JTV Rek!
- Country: Indonesia
- Headquarters: JTV Building, Graha Pena Complex, Jl. Ahmad Yani 88 Surabaya, East Java

Programming
- Languages: Indonesian, Javanese
- Picture format: 576i SDTV 16:9

Ownership
- Owner: Jawa Pos Group
- Sister channels: Jawa Pos TV

History
- Launched: 8 November 2001

Links
- Website: www.jtv.co.id

Availability

Streaming media
- MIVO: Watch live
- IndiHome TV: Watch live (IndiHome customers only)
- Vidio: Watch live

Jawa Timur Televisi
- JTV Rek!
- East Java; Indonesia
- City: Surabaya
- Channels: Digital: UHF 38, shared with Metro TV Surabaya; Virtual: 104
- Branding: JTV

Programming
- Languages: Indonesian; Javanese
- Affiliations: Independent

Ownership
- Owner: Jawa Pos Group

History
- Founded: 2000
- First air date: 8 November 2001
- Former channel number: UHF 38 (analog)
- Former affiliations: JPM (2007–2024)

Technical information
- Licensing authority: Kominfo
- Translator(s): See transmitters

Links
- Webcast: MIVO; IndiHome (customers only); Vidio
- Website: www.jtv.co.id

JTV (Jawa Timur Televisi) is a private television station in Surabaya, East Java serving the province of East Java. JTV was the first regional private television in Indonesia, as well as one of the early television stations to broadcast programs in the Javanese language. JTV broadcasts can be viewed in East Java and some areas of Central Java by aerial or by satellite.

The station is owned by Jawa Pos Group.

== History ==
JTV originated from a foundation project of a national TV station that was planned by Jawa Pos Group in 1999, under PT Jawa Media Televisi Mandiri (JMTV). However, JMTV failed to win the government selection. Despite this, because the selection which was stated under SK Menpen No. 286/SK/Menpen/1999, JMTV was placed as a stand-by if the frequency was obtained, along with the implementation of regional autonomy (including in frequency management) in 2000, Jawa Pos Group decided to establish JTV and submitted its permit to the East Java government in 2001.

The broadcasts were started on 8 November 2001 covering Surabaya and the surroundings, with the capital of 150 million rupiahs and 176 employees. The appearance of JTV once caused controversies because was considered broadcasting without permit while using its original frequency (38 UHF) by the central government, causing JTV was closed temporarily in May 2002. But, after moving frequencies and handling its permits, JTV was able to operate again and even enlarged its operations into the entirety of East Java. Two months later, on 1 July 2002, in conjunction with the 53rd anniversary of Jawa Pos, the grand launching started.

== Transmitters ==
City	Channel Digital
JTV Surabaya	38
JTV Malang	34
JTV Madiun	34
JTV Kediri	36
JTV Jember	46
JTV Pacitan	39
JTV Madura	39
JTV Bojonegoro	47
JTV Bondowoso	38
JTV Banyuwangi	34

== See also ==
- List of television stations in Indonesia
