= Parijz van Java TV =

PJTV
- Bandung, West Java; Indonesia
- Channels: Digital: 38 UHF

Programming
- Affiliations: JPM

Ownership
- Owner: Jawa Pos

History
- First air date: 1 January 2005
- Former channel numbers: 28 UHF (analog); 47 UHF (digital)
- Call sign meaning: Parijz van Java (nickname for Bandung)

Technical information
- Licensing authority: Kementerian Komunikasi dan Informatika Republik Indonesia

Links
- Website: www.pjtvbandung.com

PJTV
History
- Former names: Padjadjaran TV (2005–2010); SKTV (2017–2018)

PJTV (Parijz van Java TV) is a local privately owned television station in Bandung, West Java, owned by Jawa Pos and affiliated with JPM. Many programs are in Sundanese, but PJTV also airs in Indonesian. PJTV offers news, local culture, comedy and quiz.

== History ==
The station begun broadcasting in 2005 as Padjadjaran TV, owned by PT Esa Visual Padjadjaran Tivi. On 15 April 2010, Padjadjaran TV changed its name into PJTV.

Starting 8 September 2017, PJTV together with four other local television stations across West Java (Cianjur's CB Channel, Sumedang's SMTV, Majalengka's Jatiwangi TV and Kuningan's TVK) changed their respective name to SKTV (Sunda Kiwari Televisi, Sunda Today Television). The change coincides with the cultural dialogue event Sunda Kiwari dalam Perspektif Indonesia (Sunda Today in Indonesia's Perspective). However, in August 2018 the name reverted to PJTV, and the local stations outside Bandung also readopting their respective old name.
