= Bakrie Group =

Indonesian conglomerate

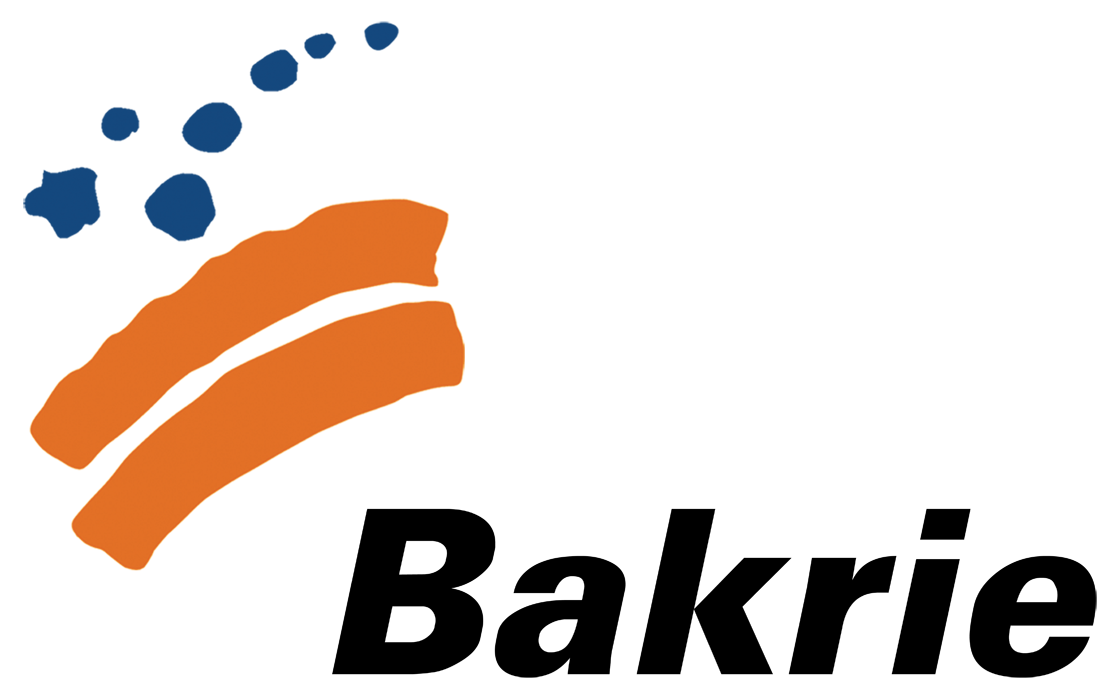

- Bakrie Tower in Setiabudi, Jakarta
- Type: Private
- Traded as: IDX: BNBR (PT Bakrie & Brothers Tbk)
- Industry: Conglomerate
- Founded: 1942
- Founder: Achmad Bakrie
- Headquarters: Jakarta, Indonesia
- Area served: Worldwide
- Key people: Anindya Bakrie (CEO & president); Aburizal Bakrie (former chairman); Nirwan Bakrie (co-chairman); Indra Bakrie (co-chairman)
- Products: Coal; Property; infrastructure; Plantation; Metal; Telecommunication; Media; Oil; gas
- Number of employees: 70,000 (2011)
- Subsidiaries: Visi Media Asia
- Website: bakrie-brothers.com

The Bakrie Group is an Indonesian conglomerate founded by Achmad Bakrie in 1942. It has ownership shares in various industries, including mining, oil and gas, property development, infrastructure, plantations, media, and telecommunications. The group is one of the largest business groups in Indonesia, with 10 of its companies listed on the Indonesia Stock Exchange.

The group is currently headed by Nirwan Bakrie and Indra Bakrie, sons of Achmad Bakrie, who serve as co-chairpersons. Aburizal Bakrie, Achmad Bakrie's eldest son, chaired the group from 1999 to 2004 before entering politics. He held ministerial positions from 2004 to 2009 and served as chairman of the Golkar Party from 2009 to 2014.

Anindya Bakrie, Aburizal's son, became CEO of Bakrie & Brothers in 2019 and chairman of the Indonesian Chamber of Commerce in 2024.

== History ==
H. Achmad Bakrie founded Bakrie & Brothers (then known as N.V. Bakrie & Brothers) in 1942 in Telukbetung, South Sumatera. Bakrie & Brothers was established as a general trading and distribution company.

In the 1950s, the Bakrie Group’s business activities expanded to include general trading, construction services, agribusiness, coal mining, oil and gas, and telecommunications, while continuing to develop manufacturing operations such as making steel pipes, building materials, and automotive components.

In 1986, Bakrie & Brothers acquired a 75% stake in the local rubber plantation company PT Uniroyal Sumatera Plantations (UNSP), which was later renamed PT Bakrie Sumatera Plantations. In 1989, Bakrie & Brothers was listed on the Jakarta Stock Exchange (now the Indonesia Stock Exchange), under the stock trading symbol BNBR.

Bakrie Group diversified into the media and telecommunications business in the 1990s. A local TV station, PT. Cakrawala Andalas Televisi (ANTV), was founded in 1992, and started to broadcast nationally in 1993. Also in 1993, Bakrie Group obtained the license to operate fixed wireless telecommunication and entered the telecommunications sector with PT. Bakrie Telecom.

In 2001, Bakrie Group entered the gas and oil sector with the founding of PT. Energi Mega Persada (ENRG), a company focused on developing and exploring for oil and gas in Indonesia. Bakrie Group also acquired 80% of the coal mining company PT Arutmin Indonesia (Arutmin) from BHP Billiton, PT Kaltim Prima Coal from British Petroleum (BP), and Rio Tinto, in 2003.

In 2007, Forbes Asia estimated the Bakrie family were worth US$5.4 billion, however, after the 2008 financial crisis, this dropped to $850 million.

In 2014, Bakrie Group, through Bakrie Global Ventura, made a US$25 million investment in a California-based private social network, Path, which is enabled with photo sharing and messaging service for mobile devices.

Bakrie Group has a limited partnership with Convergence Ventures.

In 2019, Bakrie Group made an undisclosed investment in BumiLangit Studios, an Indonesian character-based entertainment company in Indonesia. The investment was made by VIVA group, who are currently focusing on developing Indonesia's own superhero cinematic universe through the library and intellectual property rights of BumiLangit Studios. The first movie in line, Gundala, released in August 2019, was a theater hit grossing 48.3 billion Rupiah (US$3 million).

In 2020, due to the COVID-19 pandemic, Bakrie & Brothers of Bakrie Group furloughed 153 of its staff for at least 3 months. Additionally, the company also introduced salary reduction plans affecting 800 employees in their attempt to reduce financial burdens due to limited business activity.

== Companies ==
Bakrie Group is made up of at least 11 individual companies, of which 10 are still listed on the Indonesian Stock Exchange, without a controlling parent company. Each of the Bakrie companies has more subsidiaries involved in various industrial, digital, energy, and agricultural sectors.

=== Core members ===
Company name	Symbol	Business	Status
Bakrie & Brothers	BNBR	Investment and disinvestment	Still listed
Bakrie Telecom	BTEL	Telecommunications	Delisted in May 2021
Bakrieland Development	ELTY	Property	Still listed
Bumi Resources	BUMI	Coal mining	Still listed
Bumi Resources Minerals	BRMS	Gold and other non-coal mining	Still listed
Bakrie Sumatera Plantations	UNSP	Crude palm oil and palm kernel production	Still listed
Darma Henwa	DEWA	Mining contractor	Still listed
Energi Mega Persada	ENRG	Oil and gas exploration	Still listed
Graha Andrasentra Propertindo	JGLE	Property	Still listed
Intermedia Capital	MDIA	Broadcasting, Media	Still listed
VKTR Teknologi Mobilitas	VKTR	Electric Mobility (buses)	Still listed
Visi Media Asia	VIVA	Broadcasting, Media	Still listed

== Business sectors ==
=== Mining ===
The Bakrie Group operates in the mining sector, primarily focused on coal mining through PT Bumi Resources Tbk (IDX: BUMI) and its subsidiaries, including PT Bumi Resources Minerals Tbk (IDX: BMRS), PT Arutmin Indonesia, PT Kaltim Prima Coal, PT Pendopo Energi Batubara, and PT Fajar Bumi Sakti. In May 2020, Bakrie Capital Indonesia signed an agreement with Air Products (APD) to develop a US$2 billion coal-to-methanol manufacturing facility in East Kalimantan.

=== Oil and gas ===
PT Energi Mega Persada operates several oil and gas assets in Indonesia. In 2011, Energi Mega Persada expanded its operations to the Buzi Block in Mozambique through its subsidiary EMP Mining Overseas Pte. Its current operations include:

Bentu PSC, Riau

Buzi EPCC, Mozambique

Gebang PSC, North Sumatra

Kangean PSC, East Java

Korinci Baru PSC, Riau

Malacca Strait PSC, Sumatra

Sangatta II CBM PSC, East Kalimantan

Tonga PSC, Sumatra

Bakrie group's mining business, PT. Lapindo Brantas, caused an erupting mud volcano in the Sidoarjo mud flow disaster that displaced more than 40,000 people in Indonesia's East Java province. After investigations by independent experts, the police concluded that the mudflow was an "underground blowout" triggered by the drilling activity. It was further noted that steel-encasing lining had not been used, which could have prevented the disaster. Thirteen Lapindo Brantas executives and engineers faced twelve charges of violating Indonesian laws.

=== Media and entertainment ===
Bakrie Group owns PT Visi Media Asia Tbk (VIVA), which has interests in Free to Air (FTA) TV networks with antv, tvOne, VTV, and in digital media portal viva.co.id.

=== Agribusiness ===
Through PT. Bakrie Sumatra Plantations Tbk (IDX: UNSP), Bakrie Group manages an estimated 100,000 hectares (ha) of rubber and palm oil plantations on the island of Sumatra. Bakrie Sumatera Plantations Tbk (BSP) is a subsidiary of Bakrie Group. BSP has extensive landbanks. One of its directors is Bungaran Saragih, a former minister of agriculture. It operates or used to operate on peatlands.

=== Infrastructure ===
Through Bakrie & Brothers, Bakrie Group is involved in transportation, water, electricity, and industrial projects in Indonesia through several of its subsidiaries. From the 1990s, the Group worked to build a 600MW coal-fired power station, "Tanjung Jati A", in Central Java. This plant had an estimated build cost of $2.8 billion and the group would hold 20% of the equity. As late as 2019, the government of Indonesia still included the project on their National Electricity Supply Business Plan (RUPTL). In 2022, the project's environmental permit was revoked by the State Administrative Court of Bandung in response to a legal challenge from WALHI (Friends of the Earth Indonesia). This decision was not appealed by the project's sponsors before the deadline, so its current status remains cancelled.

Its subsidiary VKTR is the sole brand distributing agent (agen tunggal pemegang merek, ATPM) for BYD electric buses procured by Transjakarta, as the bus operator targeted a 100% electric-powered fleet by 2030. It provided complete built up (CBU) units imported from China as well as chasis to be assembled by local bus body builders such as Laksana.

== Sports team ownership ==
=== Basketball club ===
==== Pelita Jaya Bakrie (1987–present) ====
The Pelita Jaya Basketball Club was founded in 1987 by the Bakrie Group. Pelita Jaya is a three-time national basketball league champion. The club is managed by Syailendra Bakrie and competes in the Indonesian Basketball League (IBL).

=== Football clubs ===
==== Pelita Jaya F.C. (1986–2011) ====
Bakrie Group founded Pelita Jaya F.C. in 1986, and the club won three Galatama titles. Originally based in Jakarta, the club relocated several times, beginning in 2000, before being sold in 2012. The club is currently known as Madura United.

At the time of Bakrie Group's sale of Pelita F.C., the group purchased Arema F.C.; a merger between the two was considered, but was later cancelled in 2012.

==== C.S. Visé (2011–2014) ====
C.S. Visé, a second division league Belgium football club was acquired by Bakrie Group in 2011, during Bakrie's ownership Indonesian youth players such as Syamsir Alam, Manahati Lestusen, and Alfin Tuasalamony were called to play for the club. C.S Vise was eventually sold by Bakrie Group in 2014.

==== Brisbane Roar (2012–present) ====
Bakrie Group, through PT. Pelita Jaya Cronus, acquired A-League title-holders Brisbane Roar FC in 2011. Bakrie Group initially purchased 70% of the club shares, but in 2012 the Football Federation Australia (FFA) announced that the Bakrie Group has acquired 100% ownership of the club. In May 2016, Brisbane Roar faced administrative and financial turbulences when the team ownership held investment in the club, resulting in Brisbane Roar failure to pay staff and players.
