= Dahlan Iskan =

Indonesian businessman and civil servant

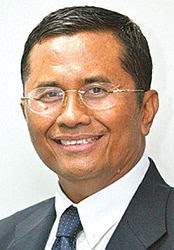
- Dahlan Iskan in 2013

6th Minister of State Owned Enterprises
- In office 19 October 2011 – 20 October 2014
- President: Susilo Bambang Yudhoyono
- Preceded by: Mustafa Abubakar
- Succeeded by: Rini Soemarno

Personal details
- Born: 17 August 1951 (age 74) Magetan, East Java, Indonesia
- Occupation: Jawa Pos Group (CEO); Indonesia's State Electricity Company (CEO, 2009-2011)

Dahlan Iskan (born 17 August 1951 in Magetan) is the former CEO of Indonesian newspaper publisher, Jawa Pos Group. He was the CEO of Indonesia's State Electricity Company (PLN) from 23 December 2009 to 19 October 2011. He was Indonesia's Minister of State-Owned Enterprises in the period October 2011 to October 2014.

Dahlan is known for his unorthodox, often personalised, approach to solving internal bureaucratic problems and inefficiencies within stated-owned enterprises (SOEs). Over time, he came to have been seen as a somewhat controversial figure. His style as a minister sometimes attracted criticism from members of the Indonesian parliament (MPs). He responded vigorously to criticisms from parliamentarians by threatening to expose details of payments allegedly made by SOEs in order to be able to meet MPs in parliamentary commission hearings. He also supported the Indonesian development of an environmentally friendly car, one of which he often drove himself. However, in a much-publicised incident, he crashed one of the electric cars.

Dahlan Iskan is also the author of No such thing as Can't, the biography of Karmaka Surjaudaja, the founder of bank OCBC NISP in Indonesia which has close links with OCBC (Overseas-Chinese Banking Corporation).

After completing his term as minister for State Owned Enterprises, he is now traveling to some countries to harvest ideas on the area of his interest such as sustainable energy while reporting his observation and analysis in JPNN.

He was sentenced guilty for corruption in 2017 by Surabaya’s anticorruption court, but was found not guilty upon appeals to the provincial court of East Java and later the Supreme Court of Indonesia.
