= Jawa Pos =

Indonesian daily newspaper published in Surabaya

- Selalu Ada yang Baru! (There's Always Something New!)

- Cover of Jawa Pos (July 30, 2018), with the headline story on front page reporting Lombok earthquake
- Type: Daily newspaper
- Format: Broadsheet (Mon–Sat); Tabloid (Sunday)
- Owner: Jawa Pos Group
- Founder: The Chung Shen
- Editor-in-chief: Leak Kustiya
- Editor: Eko Yuli Prasetyo
- Founded: July 1, 1949; 77 years ago
- Language: Indonesian
- Headquarters: Graha Pena, Surabaya, Indonesia
- City: Surabaya
- Country: Indonesia
- Circulation: 842,000 (daily)
- ISSN: 2580-2488
- OCLC number: 759490695
- Website: jawapos.com

Jawa Pos (lit. 'Java Post') is an Indonesian national daily newspaper based in Surabaya, East Java. Jawa Pos was launched by Suseno Tedjo or The Chung Shen on July 1, 1949. The parent company, "Jawa Pos Group", is owned by Indonesian media tycoon Dahlan Iskan.

The newspaper's motto is Selalu Ada yang Baru! (There's always something new!).

== Overview ==
In 1982, when its circulation had declined to under 10,000 copies, the newspaper almost went bankrupt and its ownership changed to PT Grafiti Pers, the publisher of Tempo. After the acquisition, the circulation of Jawa Pos increased and by the 1990s, circulation reached 350,000 copies. During that time, Jawa Pos was one of the largest-selling newspapers in Indonesia.

Jawa Pos set many records in the Indonesian newspaper industry, such as being the first to use computerized systems in 1984, the first to be published in full color in 1986, the first newspaper to use remote printing technology in 1988, the first newspaper to be published almost every day annually in 1992, and the first to invest in online technology in 1994. Jawa Pos was the first newspaper in Indonesia to apply the international width standard in 1998, to have a daily section for youth (2000), and to use computer to plate technology (2006).

With 842,000 average daily circulation (2017), data by Nielsen Consumer & Media View (CMV), Jawa Pos is the most popular newspaper in Indonesia.

== History ==
=== Early years (1949-1982) ===
Jawa Pos was founded by The Chung Shen, or Suseno Tedjo, on July 1, 1949, under the name Djava-Post. At the time, The Chung Shen was a movie ads employee in a cinema in Surabaya. Because every day he had to advertise the movies in newspapers, he was interested in creating his own newspaper. After the success of the Djava-Post, The Chung Shen then created two other newspapers, the Chinese-language Hwa Chiao Sien Wen and Dutch-language de Vrije Pers.

30 years later, The Chung Shen's newspaper business was not worked as well. In the late 1970s, the Jawa Pos turnover was decline sharply. In 1982, the circulation was just 6,800. His two other paper had already been folded. When he was 80 years old, The Chung Shen decided to sell Jawa Pos. He was no longer able to take care of the company, and his three children lived in London.

=== Takeover and rising (1982-present) ===
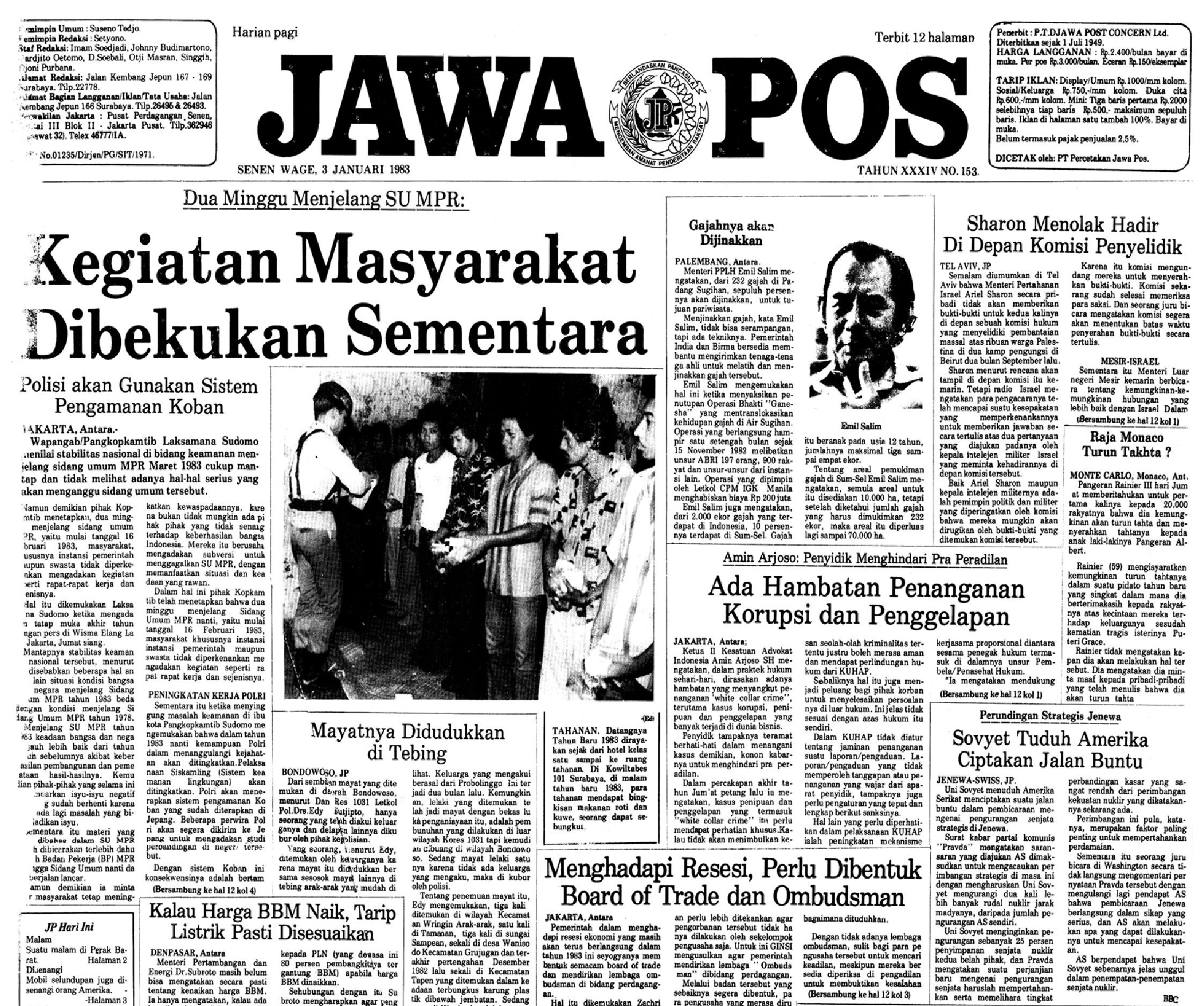
Jawa Pos on 3 January 1983

In 1982, Eric F.H. Samola, who at the time was a director of PT Grafiti Pers (the publisher of Tempo) took over Jawa Pos. With the new management, Eric appointed Dahlan Iskan, who had been head of bureau of Tempo in Surabaya, to lead the paper. After the acquisition, the circulation of Jawa Pos increased and by the 1990s, circulation reached 350,000 copies. During that time, Jawa Pos was one of the largest-selling newspapers in Indonesia.

In 1987, Jawa Pos formed the Jawa Pos News Network (JPNN), one of the largest newspaper chains in Indonesia, which has more than 80 newspapers, tabloids, and magazines, as well as 40 printing network throughout the country. In 1997, Jawa Pos moved to a new 21-storey building, Graha Pena, which become one of the skyscrapers in Surabaya. In 2002, the Graha Pena building in Jakarta was built, and now there is a Graha Pena building in almost all regions in Indonesia.

Starting August 23, 2020 edition, the Sunday edition of Jawa Pos changed its format from seven-column broadsheet to tabloid.

== Awards ==
On October 12, 2011, the newspaper was given the 2011 World Young Readers Newspaper Award by WAN-IFRA association. Jawa Pos also won the top prize for enduring excellence.

== Assets ==
Jawa Pos currently owns many regional newspapers and magazines, numbered up to 174 according to their corporate website in 2020. The company also owns several TV stations, most notably JTV, Parijz van Java TV, and Jawa Pos TV. Few of them have been defunct, including Samarinda TV (later revived a year later) and JPM TV.
