= Bumi Resources =

Indonesian mining company

PT Bumi Resources Tbk
- Company type: Public
- Traded as: IDX: BUMI
- Industry: Mining
- Founded: 1973
- Headquarters: Bakrie Tower, Jakarta, Indonesia
- Key people: Nalinkant A. Rathod (President Commissioner), Saptari Hoedaja (President Director)
- Products: Coal, CBM
- Revenue: ▼US$ 1.359 billion (2024)
- Net income: ▼US$ 89.468 million (2024)
- Total assets: ▼US$ 4.163 billion (2024)
- Total equity: ▼US$ 2.864 billion (2024)
- Number of employees: ▼67 (2019)
- Website: www.bumiresources.com

PT Bumi Resources Tbk is one of the largest mining companies in Indonesia and is structured as a holding company. In the 2012 Forbes Global 2000, Bumi Resources was ranked as the 1898th-largest public company in the world. It is the biggest producer of thermal coal in Indonesia and is majority owned by the Bakrie Group and Salim Group.

== History ==
The company was initially established as PT Bumi Modern in 1973 and engaged in the hospitality and tourism industry. It conducted its initial public offering in 1990 and shifted its business from hospitality and tourism to oil, natural gas, and mining in 1998. The company changed its name to PT Bumi Resources Tbk in 2000.

In 2013, the organisation was beset by a host of difficulties, including the discovery of US$201 million in financial irregularities, as well as regulatory problems.

== Subsidiaries ==
- PT Kaltim Prima Coal (KPC): operates approximately 90,000 hectares of coal mining concessions in East Kalimantan province.
- PT Arutmin Indonesia: operates approximately 70,000 hectares of coal mining concessions in South Kalimantan.
- PT Fajar Bumi Sakti: manages a total concession area of 8,250.5 hectares in East Kalimantan.
- PT Pendopo Energi Batubara: owns a concession area of 17,840 hectares in South Sumatera.
- PT Bumi Resources Minerals Tbk: operates other (non-coal) mining assets.
- Kalimantan Coal Limited.
- Bumi Investment Pte. Ltd.
- Herald Resources Pty. Ltd.
- Bumi Capital Pte. Ltd.
- Indocoal Resources (Cayman) Ltd.
- PT Kaltim Prima Cbm .
- PT Pendopo Energi Nusantara.
- PT Bumi Resources Investment.
- PT MBH Minera Resources.
- PT Bumi Resources Minerals.
- Calipso Investment Pte. Ltd.
- Forerunner International Pte. Ltd.
- Enercorp Ltd.
- Knightley Business Resources Pte. Ltd.
- Sangatta Holdings Limited.
- Bumi Holdings Sas.
- PT Manaor Sihotang
- PT Mitra Bisnis Harvest.
- PT Sitrade Coal.
- PT Seamgas Indonesia.
- PT Cipta Prima Sejati.
- PT Arutmin CBM.
- PT Indocoal Kalsel Resources.
- Enercoal Resources Pte. Ltd.
- Zurich Assets International, Ltd.
- PT Lumbung Capital.
- PT IndoCoal Kaltim Resources.
- PT Buana minera Harvest.
- Bumi Netherlands B.V.
- PT MBH mining Resource.
- PT Arutmin Indonesia.
- IndoCoal KPC Resources (Cayman) Limited.
- PT Alphard Resources.
- Bumi Mauritania Sa.
