= Bakrie Sumatera Plantations =

Agricultural company

Coordinates: 3°0′10.02″N 99°36′6.53″E

- Company type: Subsidiary
- Industry: Agriculture; Transportation
- Founded: 1911; 115 years ago Kisaran, Indonesia
- Headquarters: Kisaran, Asahan, North Sumatra and Jakarta, Indonesia
- Products: Rubber; Palm oil
- Parent: Bakrie Group
- Website: BakrieSumatera.com

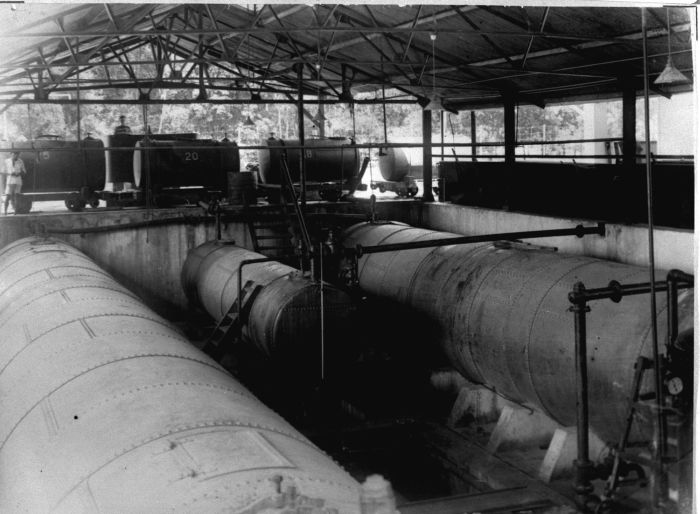
United States Rubber Plantations (Bakrie Sumatera Plantations), 1925

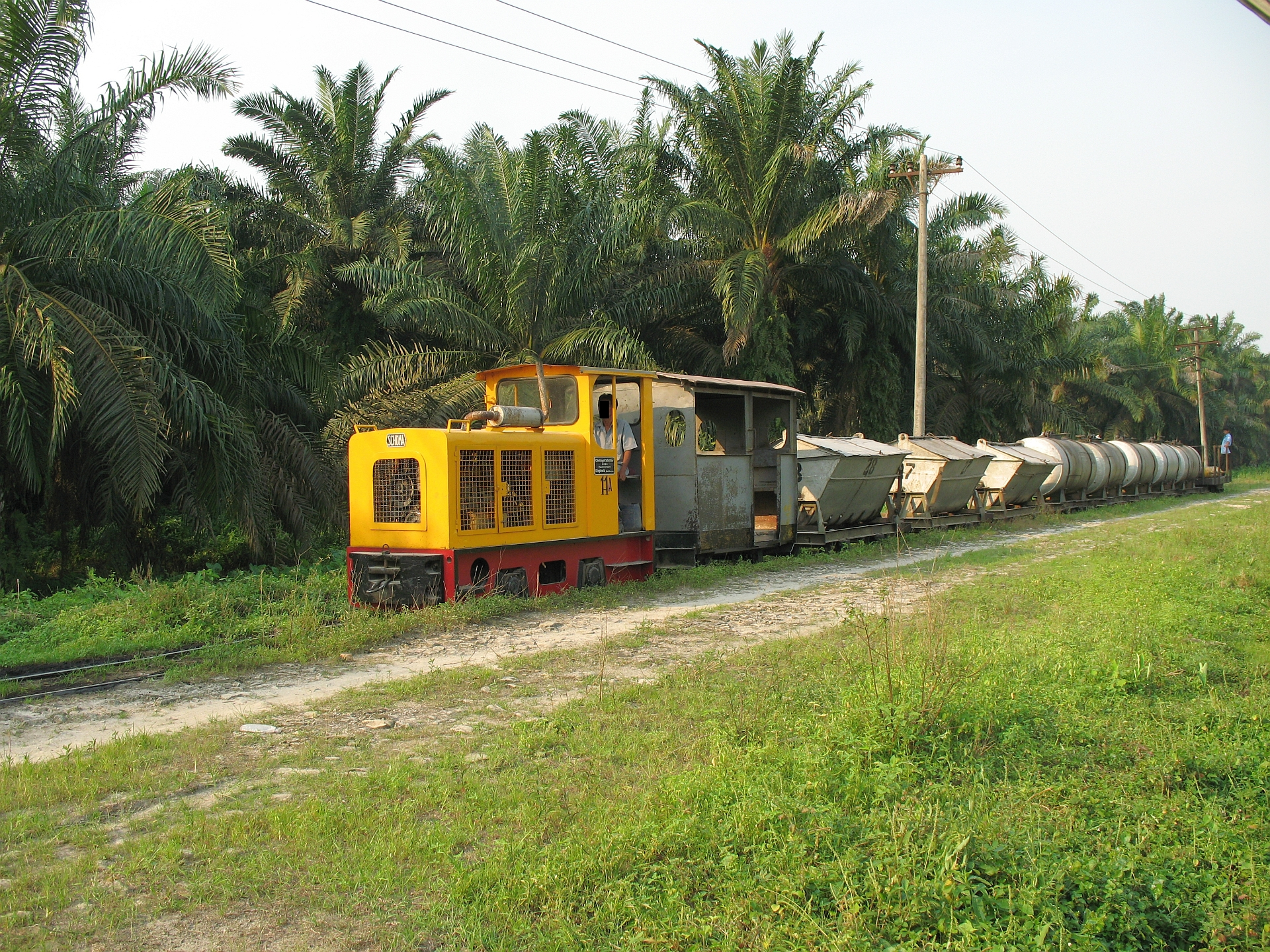
Bakrie Sumatera Plantations Railway, July 2008

Bakrie Sumatera Plantations is an agricultural subsidiary of Bakrie Group headquartered in Jakarta, Indonesia. Bakrie Sumatera Plantations manages an estimated one hundred thousand hectares of rubber and palm oil plantations, a railroad for transporting rubber, and several land banks.

== History ==
Bakrie Sumatera Plantations was founded in 1911 as N.V. Hollandsch Amerikaanse Plantage Maatschappij, opening its first rubber plantation in Kisaran. In the late 1910s, the company was acquired by United States Rubber Plantation Inc., Sumatra, a subsidiary of United States Rubber Company (USRC). In 1986 Bakrie Group acquired the company from USRC, renaming it to "PT Bakrie Sumatera Plantations" in 1990.

In 1990, Bakrie Sumatera Plantations opened a palm oil plantation in Pasaman, and acquired another one in Bah Jambi from P.T. Agrowiana the next year. In 1992 Bakrie Sumatera Plantations began converting several of its rubber plantations into palm oil plantations due to palm oil's higher profitability and greater endurance of climate change. While the company's palm oil plantations do not make use of its railroad system, as of 2016, Bakrie Sumatera Plantations still used its railroad to transport rubber.

== Rolling stock ==
The first locomotives delivered to the company were 0-6-0Ts, one from Vulcan Iron Works, two from Davenport and three from Orenstein and Koppel. In the early 1950s, the company acquired ten Ruston Hornsby locomotives, its first powered by diesel engines. Most of the Rustons were scrapped around 2006. Currently, the railway operates engines built by Ruston Hornsby, Schöma, and Diema.

=== Locomotives ===
==== Current ====
Name	Wheel arrangement	Gauge	Builder & Type (Builder number/Year built)	Notes	Photograph
D 9	0-4-0DM	600 mm (1 ft 11 5/8 in)	Ruston 48DL (425331/1954)	in use	
D 11 A	0-4-0DM	600 mm (1 ft 11 5/8 in)	Schöma CFL45B (4872/1986)	in use	
D 12	0-4-0DH	600 mm (1 ft 11 5/8 in)	Diema DFL60-1.2 (4140/1978)	in use	
D 14	0-4-0DH	600 mm (1 ft 11 5/8 in)	Schöma CFL45B (4438/1980)	inspection	
D 15	0-4-0DH	600 mm (1 ft 11 5/8 in)	Schöma CFL45B (4713/1983)	in use	|
D 16	0-4-0DH	1,067 mm (3 ft 6 in)	Schöma CFL60DCL (4950/ 1987)	in use	

==== Former ====
Name	Wheel arrangement	Gauge	Builder & Type (Builder number/Year built)	Notes	Photograph
17	0-6-0T	600 mm (1 ft 11 5/8 in)	Orenstein & Koppel 40 HP (7067/1919)	monument	
D 7	0-4-0DM	600 mm (1 ft 11 5/8 in)	Ruston 48DL (349498/1954)	dumped	
D 10	0-4-0DM	600 mm (1 ft 11 5/8 in)	Ruston 48DL (441569/1954)	dumped	

== See also ==
- Schöma

== Links ==
- Official site

Media related to Bakrie Sumatera Plantations Railway at Wikimedia Commons
