= Samarinda TV =

PT Samarinda Televisi
- Samarinda, East Kalimantan; Indonesia
- Channels: Digital: 31 UHF

Programming
- Affiliations: Jawa Pos Multimedia: Balikpapan TV (2024–)

Ownership
- Owner: Kaltim Post (Jawa Pos Group)

History
- First air date: 15 October 2013 (1st Iteration); 26 August 2024 (2nd Iteration)
- Last air date: August 2023 (1st Iteration)
- Former channel number: 59 UHF

Technical information
- Licensing authority: Ministry of Communications and Informatics

Samarinda TV (abbreviated as STV) is a private television station based in Samarinda, East Kalimantan, Indonesia. It operated from 2013 until 2023 and reopened in 2024. It is owned by Jawa Pos through its regional subsidiary Kaltim Post, headquartered at Mahakam Square, Sungai Kunjang, Samarinda.

STV started test broadcasts on 15 October 2013. It broadcast time for 14 hours and its coverage area included Samarinda, Kutai Kartanegara Regency, and parts of Bontang. It was initially the only terrestrial local TV station in Samarinda, although its existence was outlasted by cable-only Tepian TV.

In June 2022, STV had BPJS Ketenagakerjaan dues of 168 million rupiahs in arrears since 2019. This prompted protests from the Alliance of Students Caring the Development of East Kalimantan (GMPPKT), which demanded to the State Prosecutor's Office of Samarinda to collect the dues. Samarinda TV became defunct around August 2023, and its former virtual channel (numbered either 15 or 800) was soon removed by Trans Media in January 2024.

On 26 August 2024, STV resumed broadcasting. Currently, STV almost does not broadcast any locally-produced shows, but rather rebroadcasts programs from its sister station Balikpapan TV from Balikpapan.

== Programs ==
- Liputan Kocak (Licak): The only Banjarese language program on the station.
