= SEA Today =

Indonesian news television channel

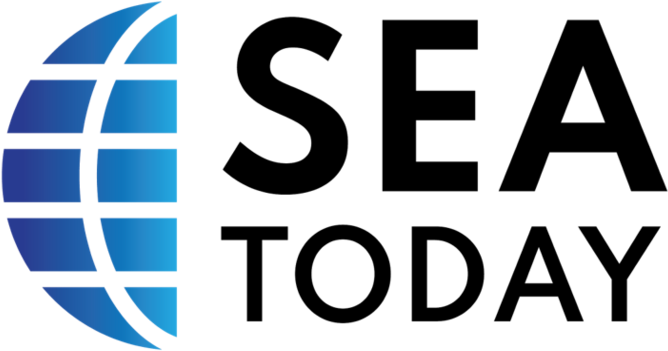
- Country: Indonesia
- Broadcast area: Indonesia; Singapore; Malaysia; India; Southeast Asia

Programming
- Languages: English; Indonesian (secondary); Japanese (tertiary)
- Picture format: 1080i HDTV 16:9

Ownership
- Owner: PT Metra Digital Media
- Parent: Telkom Indonesia
- Sister channels: (IndiHome TV channels); Usee Prime; Usee Sports; Ruang Trampil; Chinese Drama i-Konser

History
- Launched: November 2018; 8 years ago (as .idKU); 28 October 2020; 6 years ago (as SEA Today)
- Closed: 1 July 2025
- Replaced by: TVRI World
- Former names: .idKU (2018–2020)

Links
- Website: seatoday.com

Availability

Terrestrial
- IndiHome (Indonesia): 101 (HD)
- Singtel TV (Singapore): 15 (HD)
- SITI Cable TV (India): 348 (HD)
- StarHub TV (Singapore): 720 (HD)
- MNC Vision (Indonesia): 336 (HD)

Streaming media
- IndiHome TV: Watch now (IndiHome customers only)
- Vidio: Watch live
- MYTV Mana-Mana: Watch live
- Vision+: Watch live

SEA Today (abbreviation from Southeast Asia Today) was an Indonesian English-language news and lifestyle television channel targeting Southeast Asian and international audiences. Launched on 28 October 2020 in conjunction with Indonesia's Youth Pledge Day, the channel was owned by PT Metra Digital Media (MD Media), a subsidiary of the state-owned telecommunication company Telkom Indonesia.

SEA Today aired through IndiHome's IPTV service UseeTV and MNC Vision's DTH Service in Indonesia since September 2022 and StarHub TV Singapore's IPTV Services.

== History ==
The channel began on-air in November 2018 as .idKU, a 24-hour documentary and lifestyle channel. A UseeTV (now IndiHome TV) exclusive in-house channel, .idKU was intended as "a place for state-owned enterprises, governments (both central and local) and private businesses as well as small enterprises to deliver positive messages about inspiring Indonesian works through exciting, entertaining, and educating television programs".

On 28 October 2020, .idKU was replaced by SEA Today at 7:20pm Jakarta time after the final programme of .idKU 100% Indonesia music show. In their launching, SEA Today was inaugurated by the Minister of State Owned Enterprises at the time, Erick Thohir. SEA Today had transmitted via a SEA Today-owned transponder Telkom-4 108°2E for its Indonesia and Southeast Asian coverage.

In February 2025, PT Metra Digital Media, the owner of SEA Today, announced plans for internal layoffs. Several months later, SEA Today ceased broadcasting on 1 July 2025, with its final broadcast being Autoday, cut off shortly before its final sign-off.

Months after the closure, the slot of SEA Today on IndiHome TV (now MaxStream) replaced to TVRI World.

== Former and previously television programmes ==
- SEA Updates
- 2-Hour News Show
- Abandoned Places
- Angelo's Outdoor Kitchen
- Around The World in 80 Days
- Art of Indonesia
- ASEAN Oke
- ASEAN Television
- ASEAN Windows
- Australia's Most Terryfing
- Babouchka
- Break The Limit
- Buddy Talk
- Cantik Detektif
- Cerita di Balik Lensa
- Challenge Accepted
- Classic Cars
- Dreamcatchers
- Duo Backpackers
- Duo Ransel
- Eat Around Indonesia
- Field Guide to Innovation
- Find The Answer with Buya Yahya
- Focus ASEAN
- Grand Central Station
- Happy and Healthy
- House of Islam
- Islam is Good Morality
- Journals of a Nomad
- Kapsul Ramadan
- Land of Santri
- Local Pride
- Maestro
- Magnificent Megacities
- Masa Kini
- Meet The Creators
- Miss Adventure
- Mission Restorable
- Mosques Around The World
- Ngonten
- Nomadic Trip
- Ramadan in The Islamic World
- Ramadan Log
- Refugee Chef
- Richness of Creations
- Roots of Egypt
- Ruang Teh
- SEA Update
- Seafood
- SEAmphony
- See Indonesia
- Serial Tourist
- Side Walk
- Space Out
- Sportlite
- Stories From Hidden Words
- Stories of Taste
- Superheroes, The Secret Side
- Tabula Rasa
- Temurun
- The Animal Library
- The Daily Wrap-Up
- The Land of Spices
- The Majestic Alps
- The Myth of Indonesia
- The Travel Note
- The Ultimate Riders
- The Wisdom
- The Wish
- This Weekend
- Vet on The Hill
- Waterfall
- Why We Ride

== Former and previously television presenters ==
- Adityawarman
- Aris Satya
- Aubry Beer
- Bruce Poan
- Caroline Soerachmat
- Daniel Wiguna
- Dirza Prakoso
- Ellen Gracia
- Hans Lango
- Hilyani Hidranto
- Indra Marpaung
- Kai Soerja
- Karina Basrewan
- Krizia Alexa
- Maria Harfanti
- Marissa Anita
- Mochamad Achir
- Narendra Archie Prameswara
- Paul Palele
- Rahma Alia
- Ralvi Nasution
- Rangga S. Temat
- Rasya Maeve
- Rebecca Napitupulu
- Rory Asyari
- Shafira Umm
- Shahnaz Soehartono
- Shanon Sanntura
- Yasha Chatab
