= Graha Pena =

- Interactive map of the Graha Pena area

General information
- Status: Completed
- Type: Office
- Architectural style: Modern
- Location: Jalan Jenderal A. Yani No. 88 Ketintang Gayungan; Surabaya 60231, Indonesia
- Coordinates: 7.32°S 112.731388°E
- Completed: 1997
- Owner: Jawa Pos Group

Height
- Architectural: 88 m (288.7 ft)
- Tip: 175 m (574.1 ft)

Technical details
- Floor count: 22

Website
- Graha Pena official website

Graha Pena (lit. 'Pen House' or 'Pen Building') is a skyscraper building in Surabaya, Indonesia. It is one of the city's tallest buildings and is located at the south part of Surabaya. It has a height of 175 m. It is the headquarters of Jawa Pos, one of the most popular newspaper group in Indonesia.

== See also ==
- List of tallest buildings in Surabaya
