= Hikmahanto Juwana =

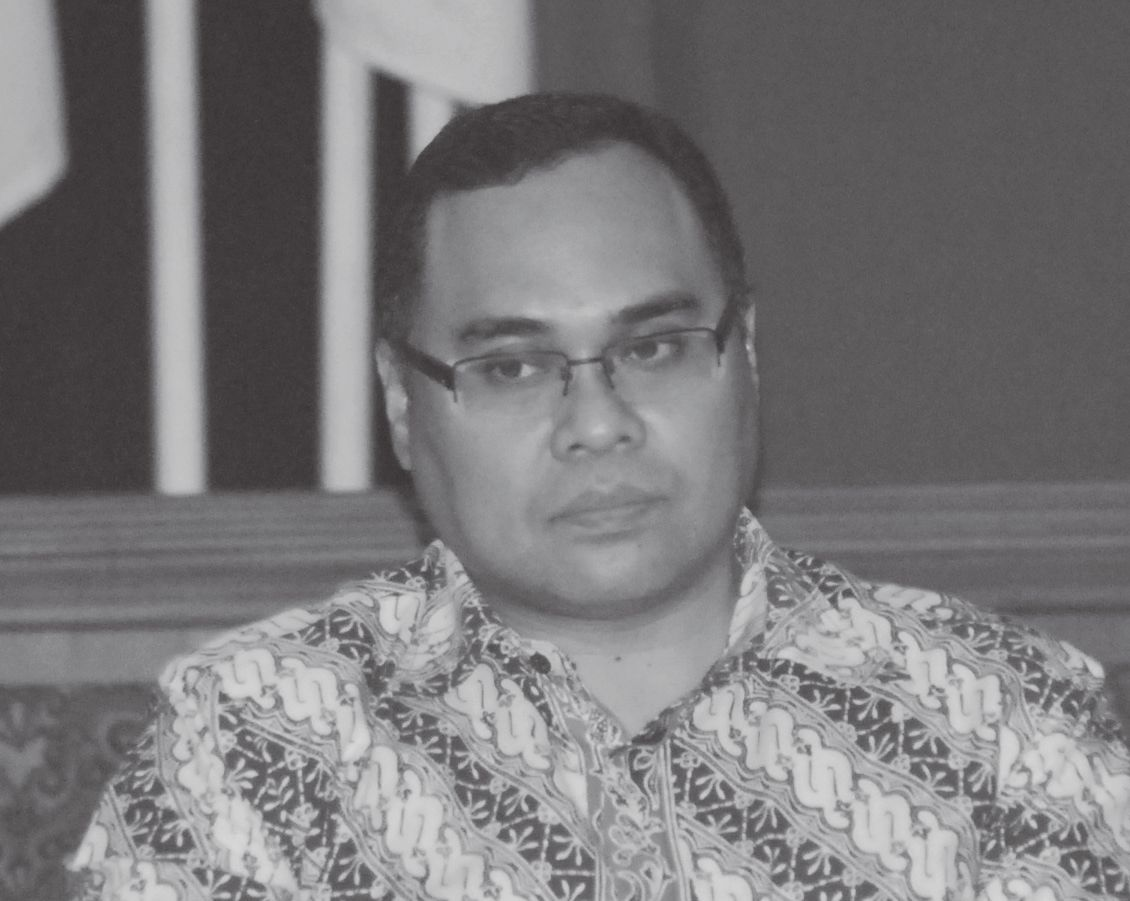

Rector of General Achmad Yani University
- In office 2021–2025
- Preceded by: Witjaksono
- Succeeded by: Agus Subagyo

Dean of the Faculty of Law, University of Indonesia
- In office 9 August 2004 – 2008
- Preceded by: Abdul Bari Azed
- Succeeded by: Safri Nugraha

Personal details
- Born: 23 November 1965 (age 60) Jakarta, Indonesia
- Spouse: Nenden Esty Nurhayati
- Children: 3
- Education: University of Indonesia (SH); Keio University (LLM); University of Nottingham (PhD)
- Occupation: Professor, International Law scholar

Hikmahanto Juwana (born 23 November 1965) is an Indonesian international law professor, recognized for becoming the youngest full professor in law at the University of Indonesia at the age of 36. He previously served as dean of the law faculty of University of Indonesia from 2003 to 2008 and as rector of the Ahmad Yani University from 2021 to 2025.

== Early life and education ==
Born in Jakarta on November 23, 1965, Hikmahanto is the second of six siblings. His father's profession as a diplomat led to a nomadic childhood, with residences in Phnom Penh, Singapore, and New York, resulting in his fundamental and secondary education taking place across various countries, including Indonesia. While he experienced fluctuating academic performance in his early years, sometimes excelling and other times struggling, he maintained his interest in law and aspiration to become a lecturer.

Initially, Hikmahanto considered pursuing a career in international relations, inspired by his diplomat father, but parental encouragement and his long-held ambition to study law solidified his decision. He began teaching at the University of Indonesia in 1983. In his second year, he began tutoring his peers in several subjects, an experience that reinforced his ambition to teach. During his third year, when asked about his career aspirations during an outstanding student selection process, he confidently declared his intention to become a lecturer. Hikmahanto was known for systematizing his lectures and compiling course materials during his university years, which proved beneficial for his teaching career. Upon graduating with a bachelor's degree in law in 1987, Hikmahanto chose to embark on a career as a lecturer at his alma mater.

In his final year of university, Hikmahanto sought practical legal experience to complement his theoretical knowledge. He interned at O. C. Kaligis's law firm, believing it would offer valuable litigation experience and exposure to interesting cases. However, after about a year, he realized that litigation was not his calling, a sentiment echoed by Kaligis himself, who suggested Hikmahanto was better suited for academia. Consequently, he returned to the university to dedicate himself to teaching and also took on administrative responsibilities, where he received significant guidance from dean Mardjono Reksodiputro. In 1989, he was awarded a scholarship for a master's degree in law from Keio University in Japan, where he spent three years, including one year dedicated to learning Japanese. During his master's thesis work on An International Law Perspective of Space Commercialization: Conflict of Interest Between the Developed and Developing States, he began planning his doctoral studies, viewing a doctorate as a "passport" for international engagement as a lecturer.

Hikmahanto earned his doctoral degree from the University of Nottingham in December 1997 with a dissertation titled The Right of State to Establish and Build Up Military Defence Capability: Japan as a Case Study. He briefly returned to Indonesia to intern at the Lubis Ganie Surowidjojo (LGS) law firm to earn tuition money and gain experience in corporate law. His time at LGS from 1994 to 1997 was initially difficult, as he felt his theoretical knowledge was insufficient compared to younger "fresh graduates". He eventually grew to enjoy his work at LGS, even with late nights, but ultimately left in 1997 to fully concentrate on obtaining his doctorate, feeling that the legal practice was not where he truly belonged.

== Career ==
Hikmahanto was appointed as a full professor at the University of Indonesia in 2001 at the age of 36 and officially inaugurated as a professor in 2002, becoming the youngest professor at the faculty. He continued his tenure as a lawyer and legal consultant, as well as becoming the advisors in various capacities to government ministries. He became assistant deputy for intellectual property, and later advisor to Government ministers such as Coordinating Minister for Economic Affairs Kwik Kian Gie, minister of foreign affairs Alwi Shihab, law minister Hamid Awaluddin, minister of defense Matori Abdul Djalil, and finance minister Boediono. He is also the chairman of the Indonesian Legal Scholars Association (ISHI).

In July 2004, Hikmahanto became the nominee for the dean of the law faculty, where he faced his seniors in the faculty. He was selected as dean on 27 July 2004 by rector Usman Chatib Warsa. His appointment was responded positively by employees. In an interview, Hikmahanto stated that he will empashis on transitioning to a professional and measurable legal institution, elevating the faculty's academic environment and bureaucratic governance, and positioning the faculty as a regional and international leader. He was installed on 9 August that year and served until 2008. Aside his deanship, Hikmahanto continued lecturing and supervise theses and dissertations. He is actively involved in academic activities at various universities across Indonesia and regularly conducts research and publishes his findings in both local and international journals.

Beyond academia, Hikmahanto holds positions as a member of board of commissioners at Aneka Tambang, Unilever Indonesia, and at Tugure Indonesia. He is often called upon to serve as an expert in Indonesian law in international arbitration disputes as both a national and international arbiter.

Recognizing the scarcity of Indonesian international law experts, Hikmahanto established the Indonesia Society of International Law (ISIL). The organization aims to cultivate international legal practitioners who can contribute and gain recognition globally. He also actively supported the Indonesian rounds of the Philip C. Jessup International Law Moot Court Competition, an international law moot court, which saw the Indonesian team, represented by law faculty students, achieve a commendable 26th position, which was a notable achievement for a developing country where English is not the national language.

== Views ==
Regarding the US invasion of Iraq, he argued that then-President Bush committed at least two war crimes: crimes against humanity and aggressive war. He maintains that international law only permits war for self-defense or under a United Nations mandate. He also strongly disagrees with the US doctrine of pre-emptive strike, which grants a state the right to attack preventively, asserting its unacceptability in the context of the US-Iraq conflict.

== Personal ==
Hikmahanto Juwana married Nenden Esty Nurhayati, his junior at the University of Indonesia, on 10 March 1990. The couple has a son and two daughters.
