= VTV (Indonesian TV channel) =

Indonesian television broadcaster

- Type: Television broadcaster
- Country: Indonesia
- Headquarters: Atrium Mulia Lt. 3, Jl. H.R. Rasuna Said, Karet Kuningan, Setiabudi, South Jakarta

Programming
- Language: Indonesian
- Picture format: 1080i HDTV (downscaled to 16:9 576i for the SDTV feed)

Ownership
- Owner: Visi Media Asia
- Parent: Bakrie Group
- Sister channels: ANTV; tvOne; Jagantara TV (channel test)

History
- Founded: 2013
- Launched: 1 July 2013 (test broadcast as sportOne); 9 January 2023 (official broadcast as VTV)
- Founder: Visi Media Asia
- Former names: sportOne (2013–2023)

VTV is a private digital terrestrial television network in Indonesia owned by Intermedia Capital (MDIA), a company under the umbrella of Visi Media Asia (VIVA) owned by the Bakrie Group. It was previously known as sportOne and rebranded to VTV on 9 January 2023.

== History ==
Initially launched as sportOne in early July 2013, the channel carved a niche for itself in the sports broadcasting landscape. However, a strategic shift in 2023 saw it rebrand as VTV, aiming to broaden its appeal to a wider audience.
