= TvOne (Indonesian TV network) =

Indonesian television broadcaster

tvOne
- Logo since 14 February 2023
- Type: Television broadcaster
- Country: Indonesia
- Broadcast area: Nationwide; Worldwide (via YouTube)
- Headquarters: Jl. Rawa Terate II No. 2, Pulo Gadung Industrial Complex JIEP, Jatinegara, Cakung, East Jakarta

Programming
- Language: Indonesian
- Picture format: 1080i HDTV (downscaled to 16:9 576i for the SDTV feed)

Ownership
- Owner: ALatief Corporation (2002–2007); Visi Media Asia (2007–present)
- Parent: Bakrie Group
- Key people: Anindya Bakrie (Chairman of Viva Group)
- Sister channels: ANTV; VTV; Jagantara TV (channel test)

History
- Founded: 15 October 1991
- Launched: 17 January 2002 (trial broadcast); 30 July 2002 (official broadcast; as Lativi); 14 February 2008; 18 years ago (as tvOne)
- Founder: Abdul Latief
- Former names: Lativi (2002–2008)

Links
- Website: www.tvonenews.com

Availability

Terrestrial
- Digital: Check local frequencies (in Indonesian language)

Streaming media
- VIVA: Watch live
- Vision+: Watch live (Subscription required, Indonesia only)
- Vidio: Watch live

tvOne, formerly known as Lativi, is an Indonesian free-to-air news television broadcaster based in East Jakarta. It is owned by Visi Media Asia (Viva), which is a part of the Bakrie Group. The network made a test broadcast as Lativi on 17 January 2002, and was launched on 30 July of that year. It was sold by Abdul Latief in 2007 and was rebranded tvOne on 14 February 2008.

== History ==
=== As Lativi ===
During the 2000s, Lativi was one of five new terrestrial television networks which were granted a license to broadcast nationwide in Indonesia. It was initially owned by Pasaraya Department Store owner and former Minister of Labor Abdul Latief.

=== After Lativi bankruptcy ===
In 2007, ownership of the network was transferred to Aburizal Bakrie and Erick Thohir. The network relaunched as tvOne on 14 February 2008. On 14 February 2020, for its 12th anniversary, the station ID and themes were revised. Its logo was unchanged until the network's 15th anniversary in 2023.

== Programming ==
tvOne broadcasts news and sports. It provides general news and current-affairs programming during the day, with sports and live events during the afternoon, evening and weekend. In addition to its daily news bulletins, tvOne airs a three-minute news summary every hour. During legislative elections and presidential and vice-presidential election debates, tvOne has high ratings.

== Wrestling controversy ==
In late 2006, the network was involved in a controversy when a nine-year-old boy died of injuries while reportedly trying to imitate the staged moves of performers on WWE Friday Night SmackDown! The network decided to pull the show and all other WWE programs after a public outcry. Authorities downplayed connections between wrestling and the boy's death, and the chief of the Bandung Crime and Detective Unit said at a press conference that there was no reason to believe that his death had anything to do with watching wrestling.

== See also ==
- List of television stations in Indonesia
- Mass media in Indonesia
