= ANTV =

Indonesian television broadcaster

- Logo since late 2016, this is the second revision of the 2006 logo, which was based on the 2001 STAR TV channels logo, and concurrently used with the wordmark since March 2003.
- Type: Television broadcaster
- Country: Indonesia
- Broadcast area: Nationwide
- Affiliates: MTV Asia (1993–1995); MTV Indonesia (1995–2002); STAR TV (2005–2009)
- Headquarters: The Convergence Indonesian Building Lt.26-28, Kawasan Rasuna Epicentrum; Jl. H.R. Rasuna Said, Karet Kuningan, Setiabudi, South Jakarta 12940, Indonesia

Programming
- Language: Indonesia
- Picture format: 1080i HDTV (downscaled to 16:9 576i for the SDTV feed)

Ownership
- Owner: Bakrie Group (1993–2007); Hasmuda Internusa Perdana (1993–2001); STAR TV (2005–2009); Visi Media Asia (2007–present); Intermedia Capital (2009–present)
- Parent: Visi Media Asia (Bakrie Group)
- Key people: Ardiansyah Bakrie (President Commissioner); Ahmad Widarmana (President Director)
- Sister channels: tvOne; VTV; Jagantara TV (channel test)

History
- Founded: 25 October 1990
- Launched: 1 January 1993 (Trial broadcast); 28 February 1993 (begin broadcasting from Jakarta); 1 March 1993; 33 years ago (Official broadcast); 29 December 1993 (begin broadcasting from Semarang)
- Founder: Aburizal Bakrie; Agung Laksono
- Replaced: CBS TV (1991–1992); SMTV (1991–1992)
- Former names: CATV (1990–1992); ANteve (1993–2003)

Links
- Website: www.an.tv

Availability

Terrestrial
- Digital: Check local frequencies (in Indonesian language)

Streaming media
- Vision+: Watch live (Subscription required, Indonesia only)
- Vidio: Watch live
- ANTVklik.com: Watch live
- MIVO: Watch live

ANTV (abbreviation from Andalas Televisi, stylized antv, alternatively spelled ANteve which was also known as a brand before 2003) is an Indonesian free-to-air television broadcaster based in South Jakarta. It is owned by Visi Media Asia (Viva), part of the Bakrie Group.

PT Cakrawala Andalas Televisi, operating as ANTV, was launched on 1 January 1993 as a local television station in Lampung province. In the same month, it was awarded a government license for nationwide broadcasting and moved its studio to Jakarta. The first programming it produced was live coverage of the general session of the People's Consultative Assembly on 1 March 1993.

== History ==
=== Background ===
In the early 90s, the Bakrie Group started exploiting the possibility of entering the television sector. Since the government of the time demanded that all private television stations (except TPI) would broadcast locally, the group eyed two private television licenses that appeared in Sumatra, PT Cakrawala Andalas Televisi and PT Cakrawala Bumi Sriwijaya Televisi. PT Cakrawala Andalas Televisi (CATV) was founded on 25 October 1990 in Jakarta, and obtained broadcasting license No. 2071/RTF/K/IX/1991 on 17 September 1991. CATV was a joint-venture between three businessmen: Nirwan Bakrie, Agung Laksono and Andy Rustam. Based in Tanjung Karang (Bandar Lampung), work for CATV's facilities in Sukadanaham began on 16 October 1992, costing Rp 15-25 billion.

Meanwhile, PT Cakrawala Bumi Sriwijaya Televisi (CBS TV) received its broadcasting license (2900/RTF/XII/1991) on 31 December 1991. The station was managed by the Bakrie Group subsidiary PT Usaha Mediatronika Nusantara (led by Nirwan Bakrie) with total investments rounding Rp 100 billion. CBS TV was set to cover Palembang and neighboring areas, while its headquarters were in Indralaya, Ogan Komering Ilir. After infrastructure work was finished, including a 10 kW transmitter, it was expected that CBS TV would start broadcasting in early 1993. Its programming was concentrated on news and sports. At the end of 1992, PT CATV and PT CBS TV started recruiting staff.

Almost simultaneously timed with the launch of the two Bakrie stations, the government issued a similar local television license for the Special Region of Yogyakarta. Under the name PT Sanitya Mandara Televisi (or SMTV), it was registered on 31 Desember 1991 under license number 2899/RTF/K/XII/1991. SMTV was jointly owned by the family of the Royal Palace of Yogyakarta, in this case GBPH Pakuningrat, alongside the owner of production company YTC, Youk Tanzil. With an investment of Rp 15-20 billion, SMTV had, as its goal, completing the building of its transmitting infrastructure and facilities at Kaliurang, by the end of 1992. After that, SMTV would begin broadcasting from April 1993, for four hours a day. Unlike the two other Bakrie stations, SMTV's focus was on local productions, such as ketoprak plays, made by local production copmanies.

At the end of 1992, PT CATV, PT CBS TV and PT SMTV dsigned a joint accord to create a television network, whose broadcasts were to start in February or April 1993. However, the only one of the three stations to launch was PT Cakrawala Andalas Televisi. It was branded as ANteve, which was seen as easy to write by viewers. ANteve started test broadcasts in Lampung on 1 January 1993, while the launch target for regular broadcasts was still April 1993. In addition to its terrestrial transmitter, ANteve's signal was delivered via the Palapa B4 satellite at 108 degrees. These tests were expected to last two to three months, and began at 6pm West Indonesia Time, lasting until 11pm every evening on UHF channel 45. The station's inauguration featured President-Director of PT Cakrawala Andalas Televisi Agung Laksono and Vice-Governor of Lampung Man Hasan. According to Agung, ANteve's broadcasts would potentiate Lampung's cultural and economic development, as well as developing a national news team, by being a local television station with a national outlook. On his behalf, Man Hasan praised its inaugural broadcast as a New Year's gift to the citizens of Lampung.

The goal in January 1993 was to have ANteve's operational structure ready during the month, and that it would be founded by Minister of Information Harmoko. As the full name of the station (Andalas Televisi, Andalas being the former name of Sumatra), ANteve became the first private television station to be based from Sumatra. On 18 January 1993, the Ministry of Information issued the SK Menpen 04A/1993 decree to legalize national private television broadcasts. On 30 January 1993, ANteve received license No. 207/RTF/K/I/1993, enabling it to start national broadcasts. Meanwhile, the two local stations (CBS TV dan SMTV) which, although having licenses, were not operational, agreed to merge into PT Cakrawala Andalas Televisi. After obtaining the national broadcasting license, ANteve moved to Jakarta. Before starting official broadcasts there, ANteve set up its offices at Pengadegan, south Jakarta, and installed a provisional 1 kW transmitter at Mulia Center fot a total cost of Rp 90-100 billion in investments.

=== National broadcasting and early years ===
On 28 February 1993, ANteve started broadcasting from Jakarta for five hours a day (6-11pm WIB). The following day (1 March 1993), ANteve produced its own programming for the first time, with the opening of the DPR/MPR general session and the first Laporan ANteve news bulletin. ANteve still considers this to be its formal launch date. After that, it planned building a 70-meter high, 20 kW transmitter at Gunung Lemo, Cianjur, West Java. Efforts to build transmitters in Medan, Palembang, Bandung, Semarang, Yogyakarta, Surabaya, and Ujung Pandang by June 1993 were underway, in order to have the network operational in those cities by the end of the year. Continuing what CBS TV had promised, most of its early programming consisted of sports broadcasts.

However, ANteve faced difficulties such as the expansion of the network (only Bandung and Surabaya), transmitter failures and low ratings. In order to solve this problem, ANteve was relaunched on 25 February 1994 as a television network catering mainly kids and teens, mainly airing movies and music. It moved its studios from to Puri Kembangan, West Jakarta. Later, in association with TPI, it built its national transmitting network, to cover a national audience by year-end 1994. On 5 May 1995, ANteve established a broadcasting partnership with MTV, and, in 1996, consolidated its reputation as a music and sports channel. Its association with MTV was not limited to Western music, as ANteve collaborated with Indonesian music, especially dangdut. At the time, its programming composition was 40% news, 40% entertainment and 20% sports. From 1996, it started broadcasting in stereo and its daily programming lasted 22 hours a day. It was also an Indonesian pioneer in the SNG technology during the production of Saksi Mata, which focused on court cases.

The 1997–1998 financial crisis caused ANteve to reduce the number of hours of programming a day (from 22 to 14), as well as reducing the amount of imported content, which caused the station to fall behind the five most watched television networks in Indonesia at the time. In the early 2000s, ANteve was drowned in debt and changed owners (one of which went bankrupt), which caused the network to change its mindset, especially its image.

=== Reinvention (2001–2014) ===
In early 2001, ANteve registered a feed at the Museum of Indonesian Records for holding a five-hour concert. Later, on 31 March 2002, it became a network for all ages (coinciding with the removal of MTV programs, which moved to Global TV on 7 March 2002). The removal of MTV content caused the channel to lose its solid audience base. After restructuring, in March 2003 (coinciding with its tenth anniversary), ANteve was rebranded, with the name becoming antv. Programming was expanded to cover children and families, and it was expected that, with the reface, which cost Rp 7 billion, ANTV's public perception would improve. The new ANTV had a more general outlook, but was still known for its sports telecasts, such as Indonesia Super League and Premier Division. The insistence in sports coverage, especially football, was due to the fact that one of the network's owners had connections to the Football Association of Indonesia, namely Nirwan Bakrie. These telecasts continued until 2014, when fundamental programming changes took place.

On 29 September 2005, STAR TV (then-owned by Rupert Murdoch's first incarnation of News Corporation) bought a 20% stake in ANTV.

Along with RCTI, MNCTV, GTV, and iNews, ANTV completed the analogue switch-off on 3 November 2022. ANTV Jakarta was still transmitted in PAL, while ANTV already turned to DVB-T2 services, and later shut it down on 4 November, after ASO ran a text on the ANTV Jakarta analogue feed.

== Sports programming ==
ANTV has shown the 2014 FIFA World Cup, Indonesian Super League, Liga Indonesia Premier Division, Formula One in 1997, and Grand Prix motorcycle racing until the 2001 season.

Between 2015 and 2022, ANTV did not air any sports programming.

On 16–17 July 2022, ANTV aired a friendly match between Persija Jakarta vs RANS Nusantara F.C., making a return of sports programming to the channel. Also airing Persebaya vs PSIM. In September 2022, the network started airing One Pride MMA series, a local, network-owned mixed martial arts promotion, moving from tvOne.

ANTV broadcasts the Bundesliga from 2022 to 2023.

In November 2025, ANTV acquired the rights to broadcast Serie A to 2027.

== Logo history ==
First logo of ANTV (ANteve), used from 1993 to 1994

Second logo of ANTV after moving its studio to Jakarta, used from 1994 to 2003 and was spelled as ANteve

Third logo with the current wordmark used from 2003 to 2006

Fourth logo, with the Star TV branding which was being used since 2001, also was used from 2006 to 2009

Fifth logo used from 2009 to late 2016, this is the first revision of the 2006 logo

The current logo used since late 2016, this is the second revision of the 2006 logo. This logo first appeared on screen in 2018.

Logo used during commercial breaks from 2009 to 2013 and again since 2018 (it was also used during shows in 2012–2013).

== See also ==
- List of television stations in Indonesia
