= Coat of arms of East Java =

- Adopted: 1966; 1974 (with motto)
- Shield: Per the Blue and Gold fess, a Black volcano belches White smoke, in front of it is the Heroes' Monument between the temple gates, at the top is a Golden star emitting rays, and below it are waves of blue and white.
- Motto: Jer Basuki Mawa Bewa in black letters on a white ribbon.

The Coat of arms of East Java is a shield with a pentagonal base shape. This symbol consists of images of stars, hero monuments, volcanoes, temple gates, rice fields and fields, rice and cotton, rivers, wheels and chains, with a white ribbon bearing the regional motto written in Old Javanese: Jer Basuki Mawa Beya.

== Meaning ==
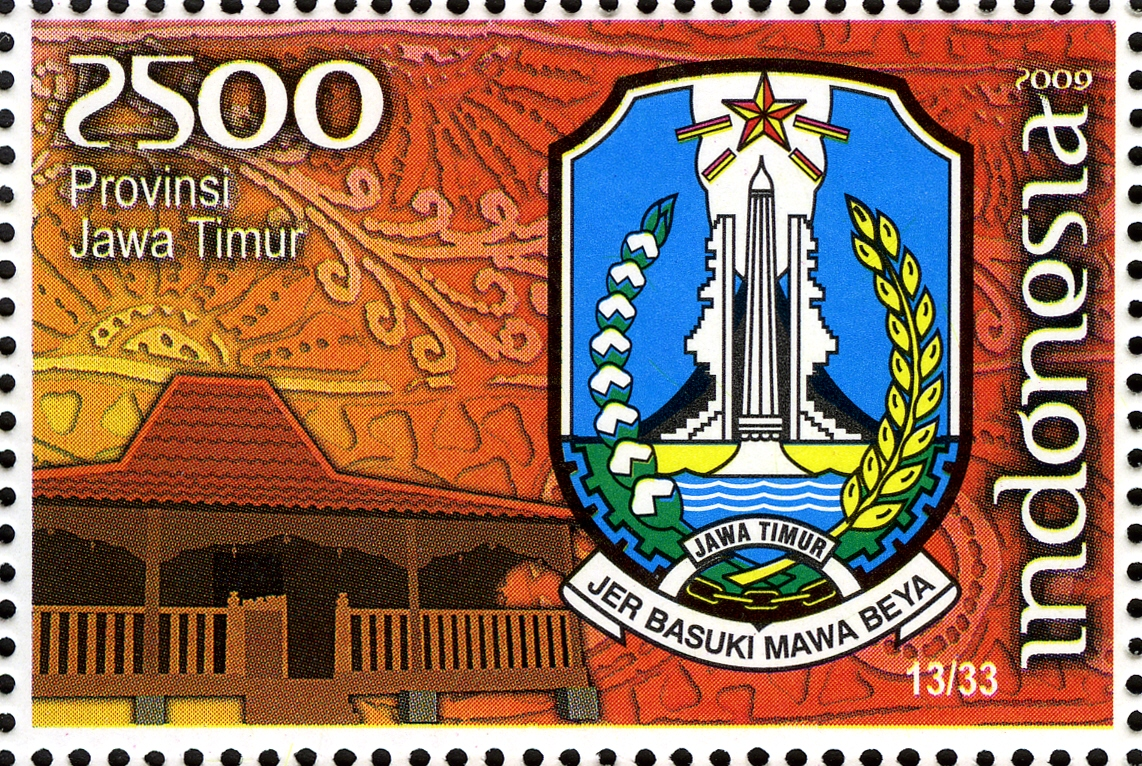
Stamp of Indonesia in 2009, showing the coat of arms of East Java

1. The shield-shaped leaf symbolizes security, peace, and honesty, representing the foundation and aspirations of the people of East Java, a region considered safe.
2. The golden star symbolizes the One Almighty God. Its five-pointed and five-pointed star symbolizes Pancasila, the foundation and philosophy of the state, which is always upheld and always illuminates the souls of its people (in this case, the people of East Java), especially the spirit of the One Almighty God.
3. The Heroes Monument is a symbol of heroism, depicting the heroic nature and spirit of the people of East Java (especially Surabaya) in defending the sovereignty and territory of their homeland.
4. The volcano, constantly billowing smoke, symbolizes the steadfastness and triumph of East Java's determination, with its dynamic, revolutionary spirit, never giving up in completing the revolution towards the ideals of a Just and Prosperous Society. It also illustrates the abundance of volcanoes in East Java.
5. The gray gate (of the temple) symbolizes the ideals of struggle and the greatness of East Java in the past, which are still visible and symbolize the boundary between the past and the present, a struggle whose spirit remains with every Indonesian patriot in East Java.
6. The rice fields and fields, depicted in yellow and green, symbolize prosperity, as East Java boasts rice fields and fields that are the source and means of achieving prosperity.
7. Rice and cotton, symbolizing food and clothing, are the people's daily staples. The image of rice has 17 grains, while the image of cotton has 8 grains, symbolizing the sacred date for the Indonesian people, 17 August 1945.
8. The wavy rivers indicate that East Java has many rivers with sufficient flow to irrigate the rice fields and other sources of prosperity in East Java.
9. The wheel and chain depict the current situation in East Java, where factories and other industrial development are rapidly underway. They also symbolize the unwavering determination and sense of camaraderie typically shown by the people of East Java to visitors from all over the world.
10. The ribbon, emblazoned with the words "Jawa Timur", represents the symbol of the East Java Province.
11. The white ribbon, emblazoned with the words "JER BASUKI MAWA BEYA", represents the East Java motto, which implies that achieving happiness requires sacrifice.

== See also ==
- Armorial of Indonesia
