= Sura and Baya Statue =

Statue in Surabaya

- Patung Sura dan Baya ꦥꦠꦸꦁꦱꦸꦫꦭꦤ꧀ꦧꦪ
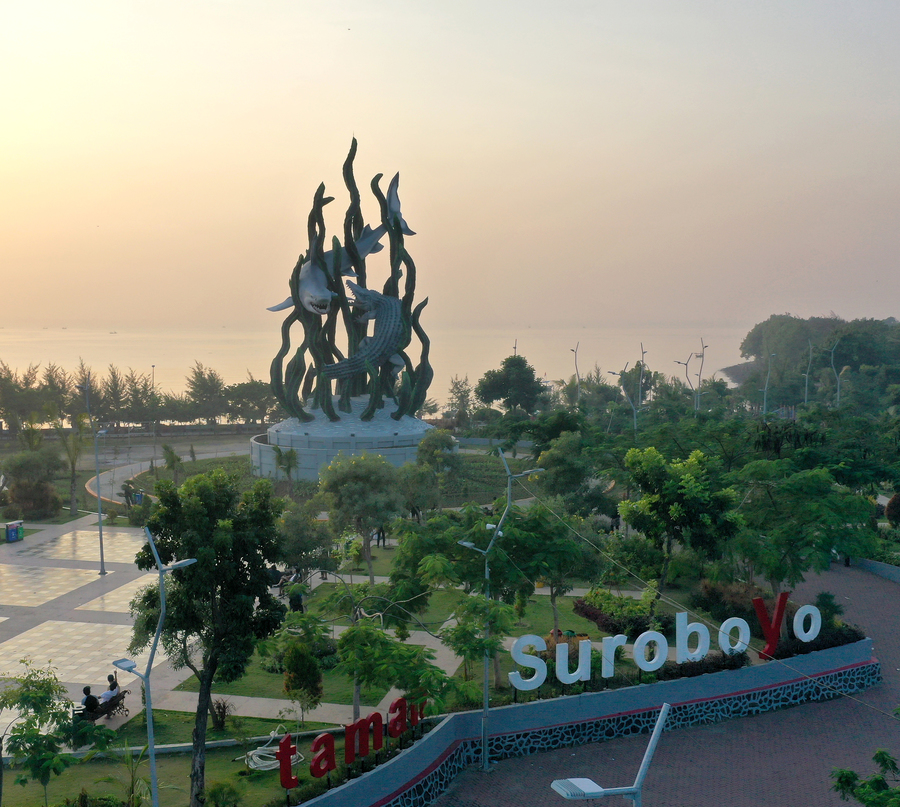
- The Statues

General information
- Type: Statue
- Location: Surabaya, Indonesia
- Inaugurated: 1989 (2018 at Taman Suroboyo)
- Operator: Government of Surabaya

Height
- Height: 2,6 m

Design and construction
- Architects: Sutomo Kusnadi; Sigit Margono

Sura and Baya Statue (Indonesian: Patung Sura dan Baya; Javanese: ꦥꦠꦸꦁꦱꦸꦫꦭꦤ꧀ꦧꦪ, romanized: Patung Sura lan Baya) are one of the most famous icons of the city of Surabaya in East Java, Indonesia. The statue consists of two types of animals, shark and crocodile. The statue is found in three places across the city.

== Meaning of Philosophy ==
=== According to Legend ===
Sura and Baya image as a coat of arms of Surabaya.

The Sura and Crocodile statues contain folklore or legends about the Sura fish and crocodiles. According to legend, a long time ago there was a big fight between sura fish and crocodiles somewhere. The first fight was because there were sura fish that left the area towards the river. Knowing this, the crocodile who was the ruler of the land felt unwelcome and asked the sura fish to return to the sea. From there, a big fight took place to successfully return the sura fish to the sea. Therefore, it is not surprising that the shape of the statue shows two animals fighting. However, the place where the battle took place was named "Surabaya".

=== According to History ===
The Sura and Boyo statues symbolize "those who dare to face danger". Linguistically, "sura" means courage, while "baya" means danger. In the past, when the Majapahit Kingdom was founded, there was an attack by the Tar-Tar people or Mongols who invaded the land of Java. The people came from the north of this island, they landed in East Java. The leader of the Javanese army who was able to expel the Tar-Tar or Mongols at that time was named Raden Wijaya or the forerunner of the Majapahit Kingdom. Raden Wijaya then called him "sanggramacura" or "a brave person who is afraid because of his courage in facing danger" or in other words Çirabhaya which means "dare to face danger". Raden Wijaya is symbolized as a brave warrior, while the Mongol army symbolizes the danger that came to the island of Java.

== Locations ==
=== Surabaya ===
This statue is located in three places in the city of Surabaya:

1. In front of the Surabaya Zoo. The statue here is the most beautiful statue. This statue was built in 1988 by architect Sutomo Kusnadi and sculptor Sigit Margono.
2. Kapindho, ing Surabaya Skate and BMX Park Genteng. Statue of the height 15 meters and can spray water from the mouth of the shark fish Kali Mas on the edge.
3. The last one is in Surabaya Park Kenjeran. The largest statue is 25.6 meters high, while the sitting statue measures 5 meters and 15 meters in diameter. This statue is the newest Sura and Baya statue, as of 2019.

=== Foreign Country ===
The Sura and Baya statues aren’t only found in Surabaya, but also brought abroad in South Korea. This statue was inaugurated by the former Mayor of Surabaya, Tri Rismaharini who is now Minister of Social Affairs on 1 July 2014. This statue stands in a city park located at the Busan Indonesian Center. The statue in Busan seems to be a symbol of the commitment of the Surabaya City Government and the Busan City Government. The statue was made by an artist named Agung Tato, made of bronze with a height of 2.6 meters and a diameter of 0.75 meters. Collaboration between the two governments began in 1994 in the fields of culture, education, economics and fashion.

== See also ==
- Surabaya Zoo
- Heroes Monument
- Suramadu Bridge
- Education Museum
