= Coat of arms of Surabaya =

- Armiger: City of Surabaya
- Adopted: 14 December 1956
- Shield: Azure, a shark reguardant in chief and a crocodile to the sinister reguardant in base Or, and the Tugu Pahlawan monument in Surabaya per pale Argent.
- Motto: None
- Earlier version(s): 1931-1956; 1920-1931
- Use: displayed on municipal buildings, government documents, official publications, signage, and other civic materials.

The coat of arms of Surabaya is the armorial bearing used to represent the city of Surabaya in East Java, Indonesia. Its original design was proposed by L. C. R. Breeman, a prominent Dutch colonial-era banker and secretary of Soerabaja Spaarbank (Nutsspaarbank), for the municipal government of Surabaya (incorporated as a gementee) in 1918. The proposed arm was adopted by the Surabaya Municipal Government in 1920 through Gemeenteblad No 167 and was reworked due to the Dutch High Council of Nobility's instruction in 1931. Upon independence, it's colonial arm was replaced by a new heraldic visual stripped of its full royal achievement through a Surabaya Provisional Regional House of Representatives Order in June 1956 and was formally decreed by the then President Sukarno in December the same year.

It is the only city emblem in Indonesia that does not feature the city's name nor a motto, despite Government Regulation No. 77 of 2007 requiring regional emblems to reflect local potential, aspirations, and a motto expressing those aspirations; nevertheless, the emblem remains in official use throughout the city.

== Description ==
The half hexagon which is distilled and blue in color. In the middle of the shield there is a painting of a silver (white) warrior monument. Behind the painting of the warrior monument there is a golden (yellow) shark at the top and a golden (yellow) crocodile at the bottom, both of them attacking each other. the Coat of Arms is monumented with the name Sura and Baya Statue.

=== Dutch East Indies ===
Coat of arms of Surabaya Municipality

Versions
- Lesser royal achievement
- Armiger: Stadsgemeente Soerabaia
- Adopted: 11 August 1931
- Relinquished: 14 December 1956
- Crest: A mural crown of five towers (also a crown of three leaves and two pearls).
- Shield: Azure, a shark reguardant in chief and a crocodile to the sinister reguardant, both Argent.
- Supporters: Two lions rampant Or armed and langued Gules
- Motto: SOERA-ING-BAJA in golden lettering on a scroll Azure.

The first emblem of Surabaya was officially granted on 11 August 1931. The arms consisted of a shield, divided diagonally by an embattled line, on the image Azure, a shark reguardant in chief and a crocodile to the sinister reguardant, both Argent. The arms were supported by lions, above the arms was a mural crown, The motto in Latin says SOERA-ING-BAJA in golden lettering on a scroll Azure.
