= Heroes Monument =

Monument in Surabaya

Heroes’ Monument
- Tugu Pahlawan
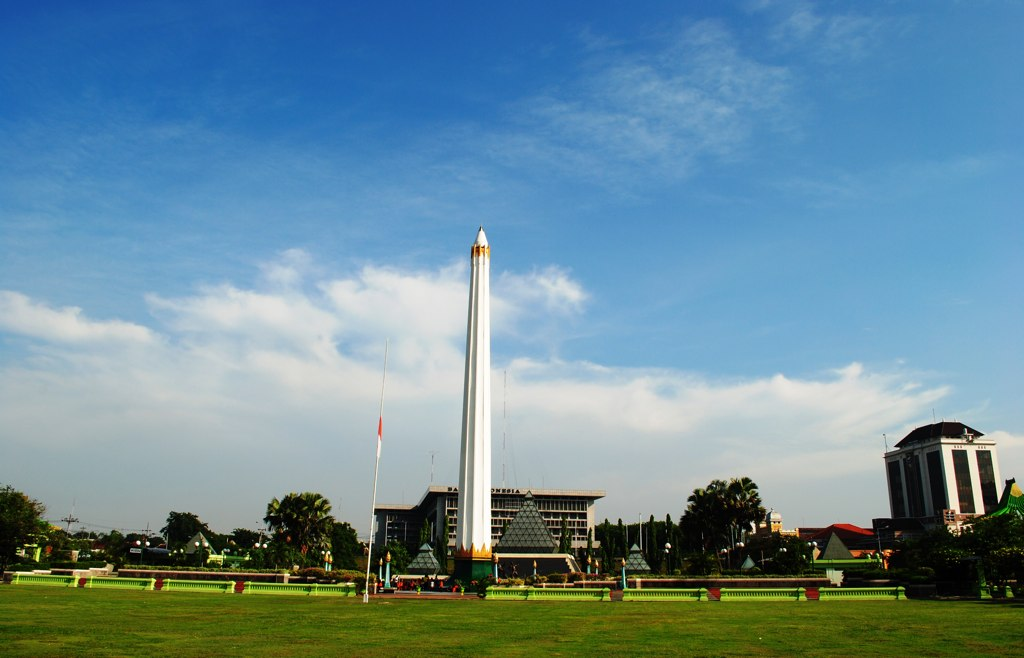
- Heroes’ Monument, circa 2010s.
- Interactive map of Heroes’ Monument
- Location: Surabaya, East Java, Indonesia
- Coordinates: 7°14′46″S 112°44′15″E
- Designer: Surabaya City Government
- Type: Monument
- Width: 3.1 m (10 ft)
- Height: 41.15 m (135.0 ft)
- Completion date: 10 November 1952; 73 years ago
- Dedicated to: Indonesian Heroes
- Website: Tugu Pahlawan

The Heroes Monument (Indonesian: Tugu Pahlawan) is a monument in Surabaya, East Java, Indonesia. It is the main symbol of the city, dedicated to the people who died during the Battle of Surabaya on 10 November 1945. The 10 November Museum is located under the monument.

This monument is 41.15 metres tall and is pillar-shaped. It was built to commemorate the events of 10 November 1945 at the Battle of Surabaya. It is the venue every 10 November for the commemoration of the events of 1945, when many heroes died in the War of Independence.

The groundbreaking was led by Sukarno, the first Indonesian President, accompanied by Surabaya Mayor, Doel Arnowo on 10 November 1951. It was officially opened one year later, also by Sukarno, on 10 November 1952 witnessed by Surabaya Mayor, R. Moestadjab Soemowidigdo.

The 10 November Museum was built to explain the meaning behind the Heroes Monument. The building consists of 2 floors, with exhibitions symbolizing the spirit of the Surabaya people's struggle. There is an auditorium on the first floor. The museum contains reproductions of documentary photographs, and some dioramas present eight events that happened around the 10 November 1945 clashes.

== Background ==
The monument was established to honour the arek-arek Suroboyo (youth of Surabaya) and other Indonesian fighters who fell during the Battle of Surabaya on 10 November 1945, the largest single battle during the Indonesian National Revolution. This battle involved local republican forces resisting Allied troops and returning Dutch colonial interests attempting to re-establish control; the scale of the confrontation and the heavy casualties it produced contributed to 10 November being nationally observed as Hari Pahlawan (Heroes’ Day). The monument’s location in downtown Surabaya, near the East Java Governor’s Office, is on land formerly occupied by the Raad van Justitie building, later used by the Japanese Kempeitai during World War II, making the site itself historically significant in the city’s wartime and colonial past.

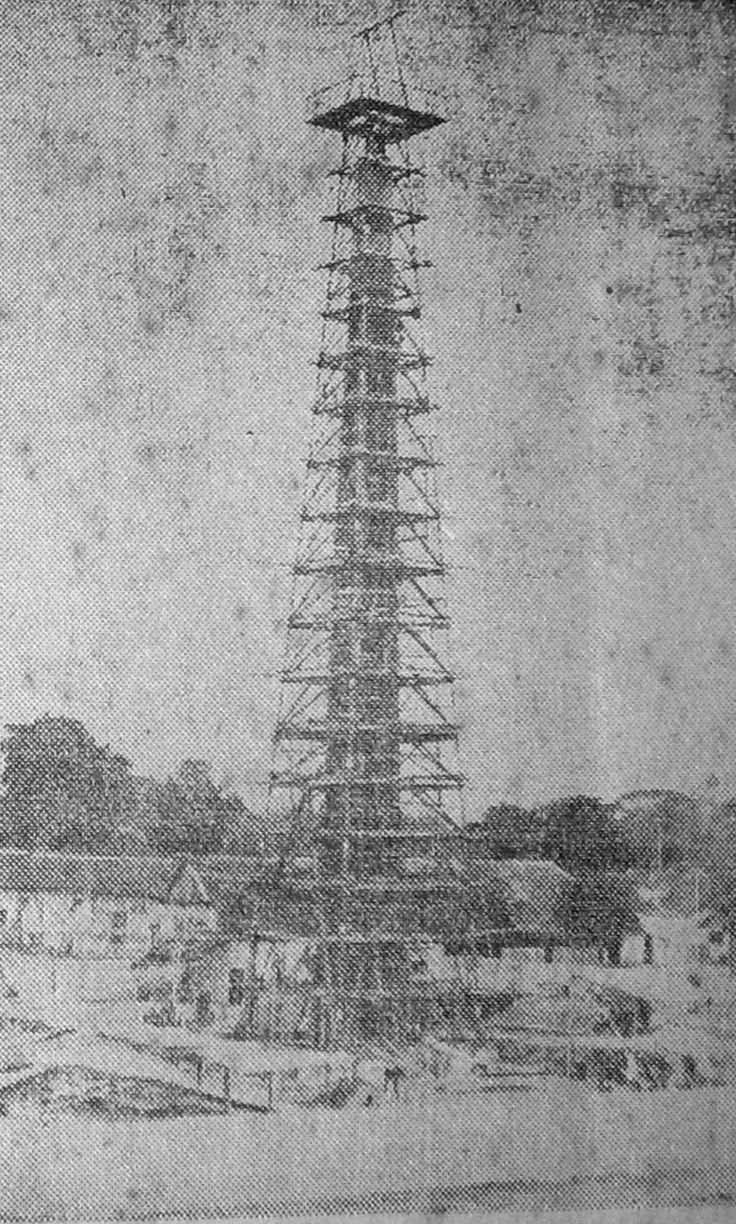
The monument under construction, c. 1952

Construction of Tugu Pahlawan commenced with the laying of the foundation stone on 10 November 1951, officiated by President Sukarno alongside Surabaya’s mayor, and was completed and inaugurated exactly one year later on 10 November 1952.

== Gallery ==
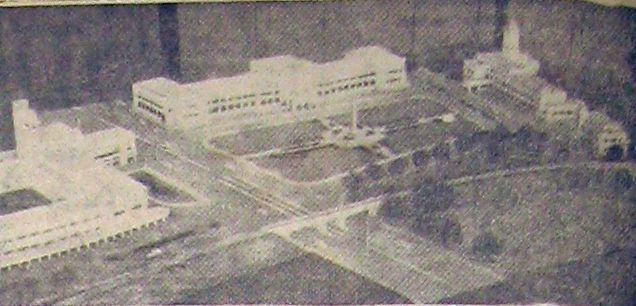

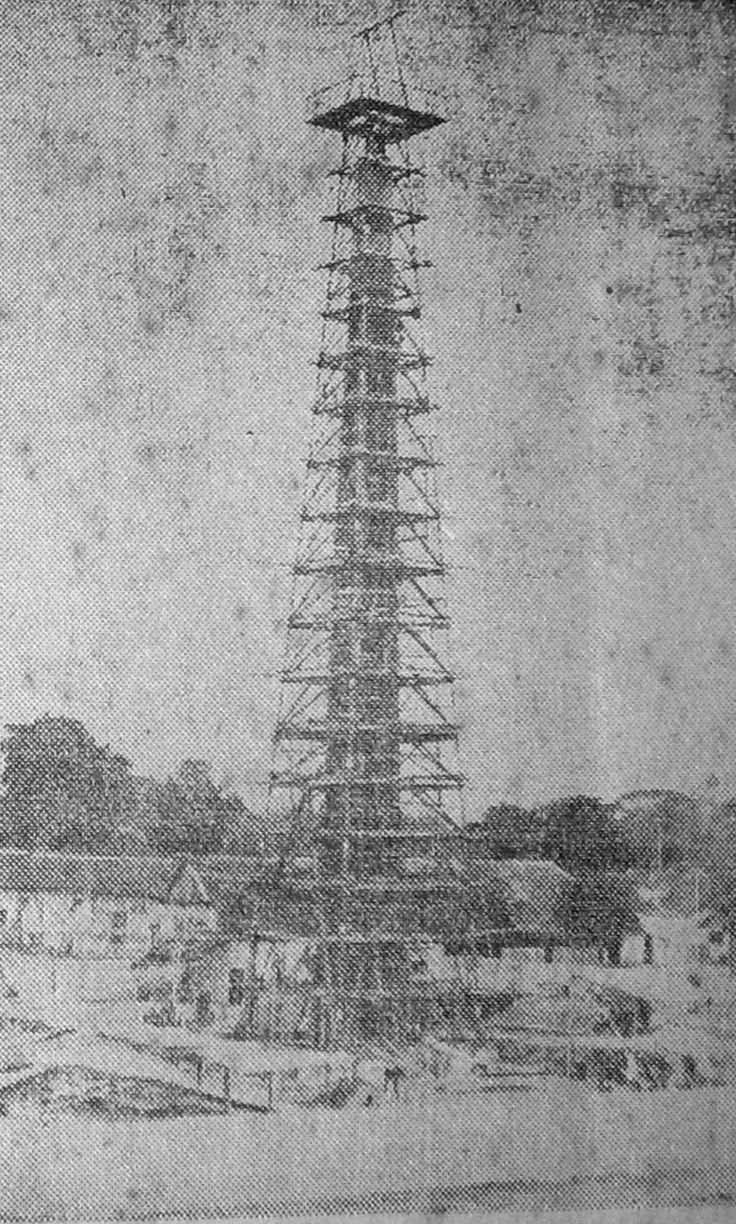
Under construction in 1952

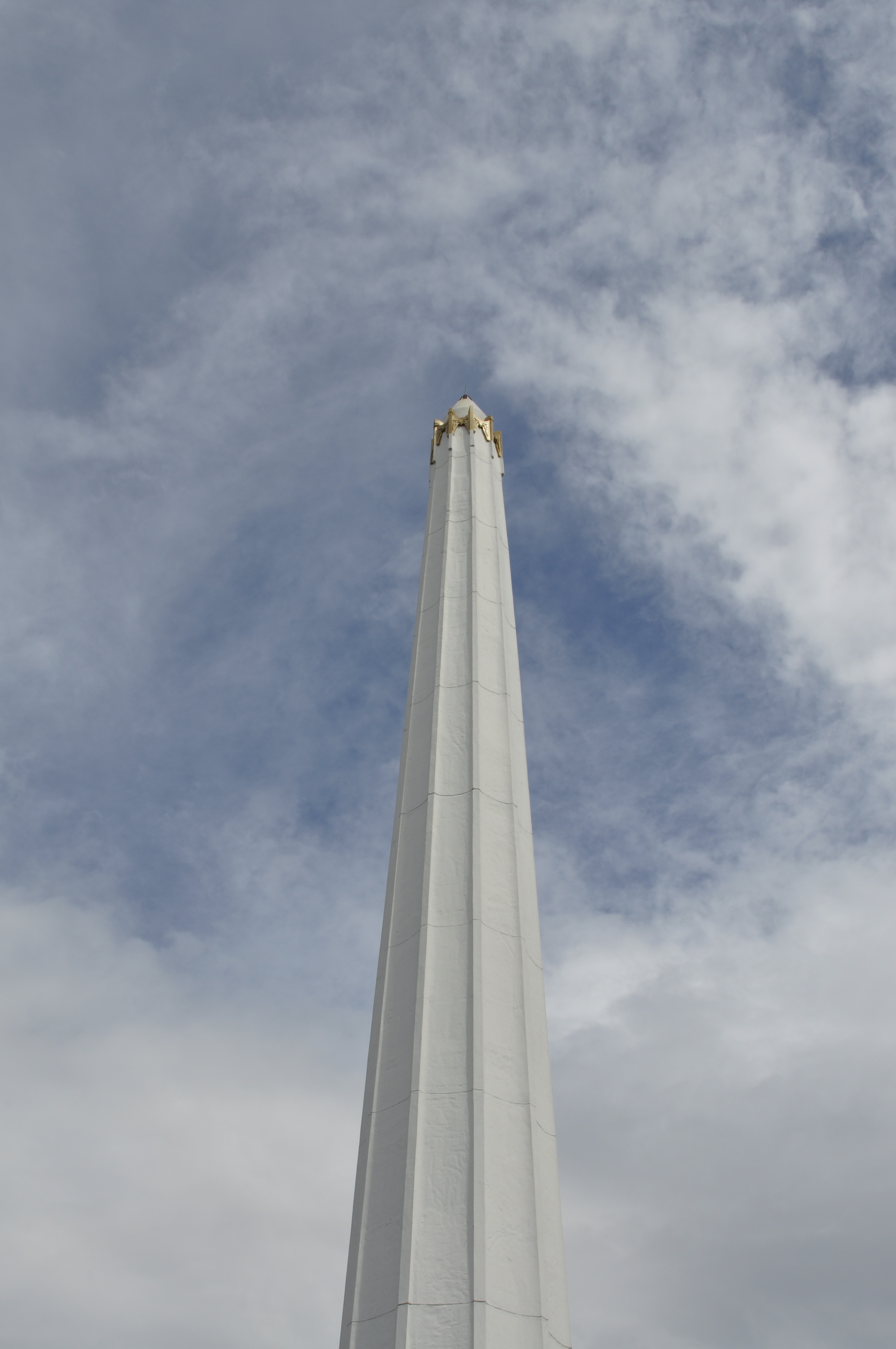

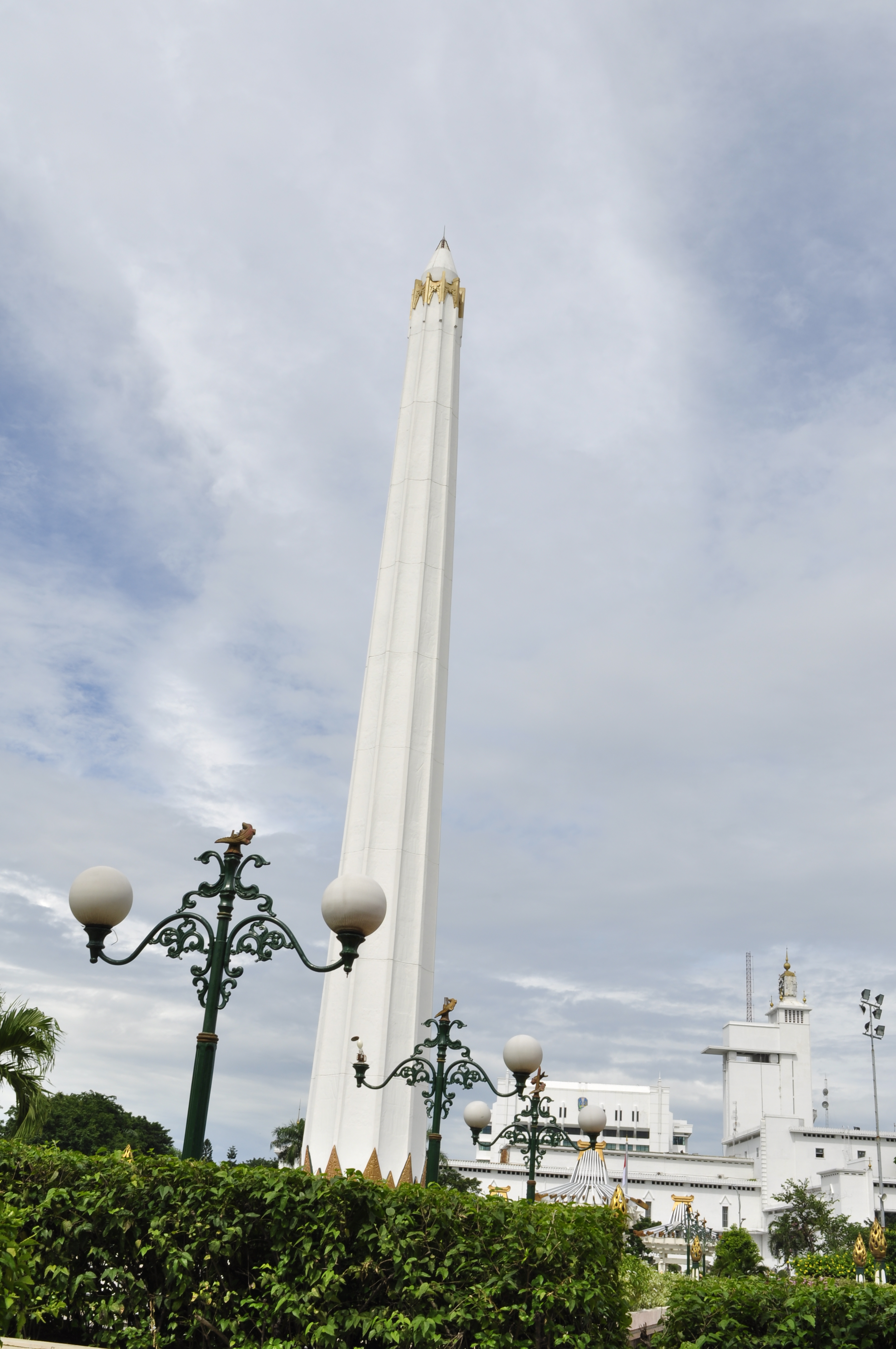

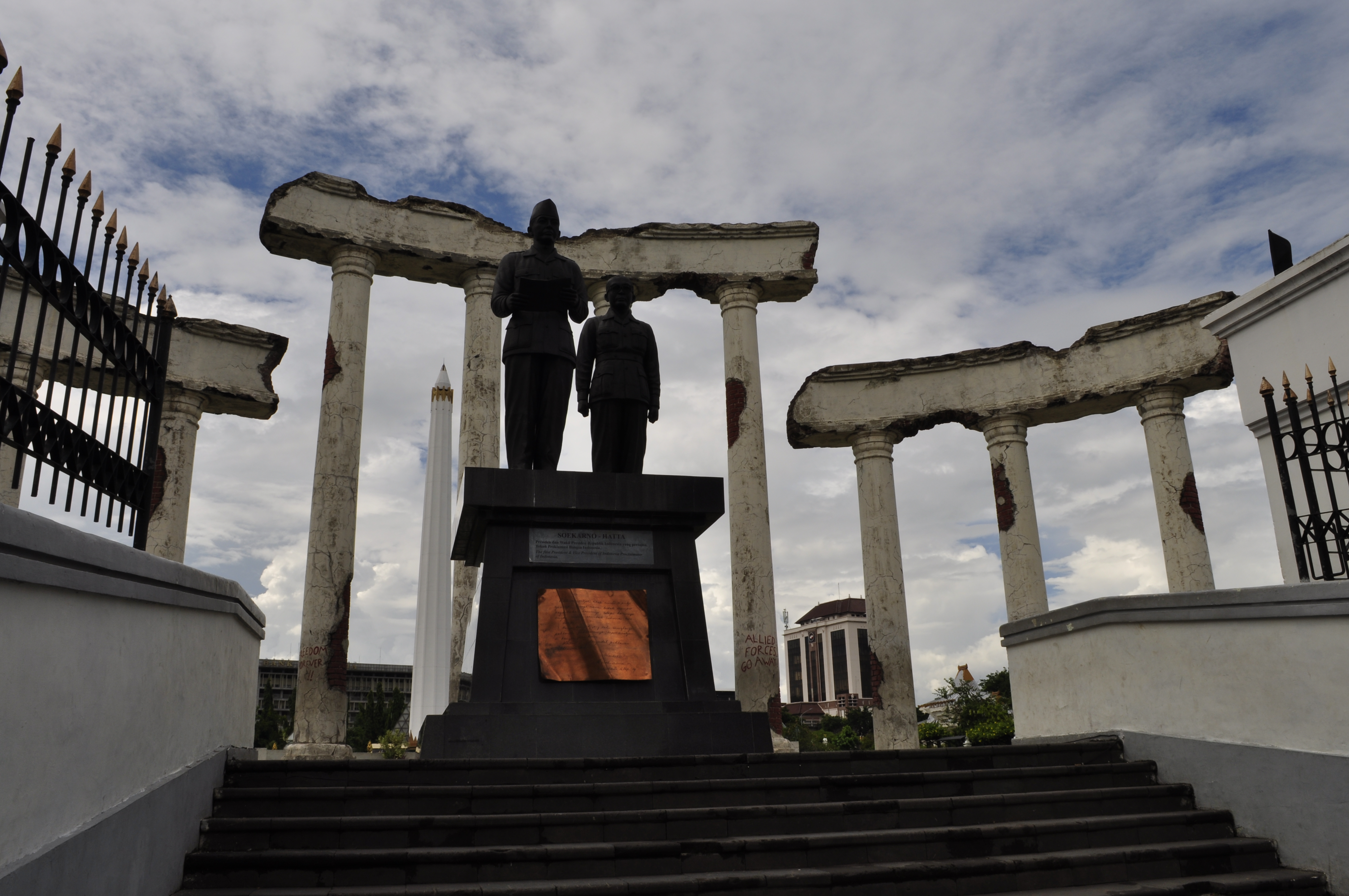

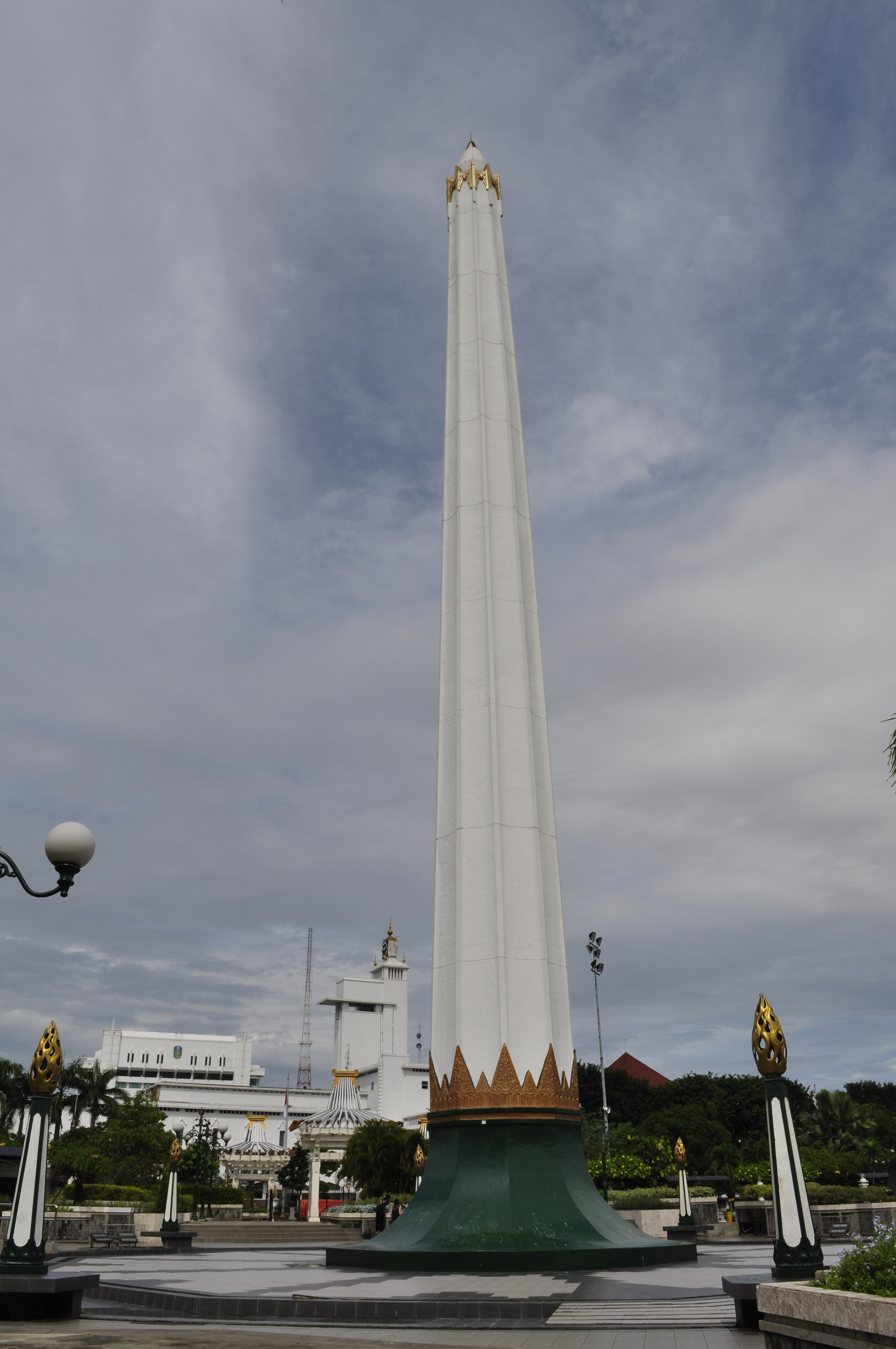

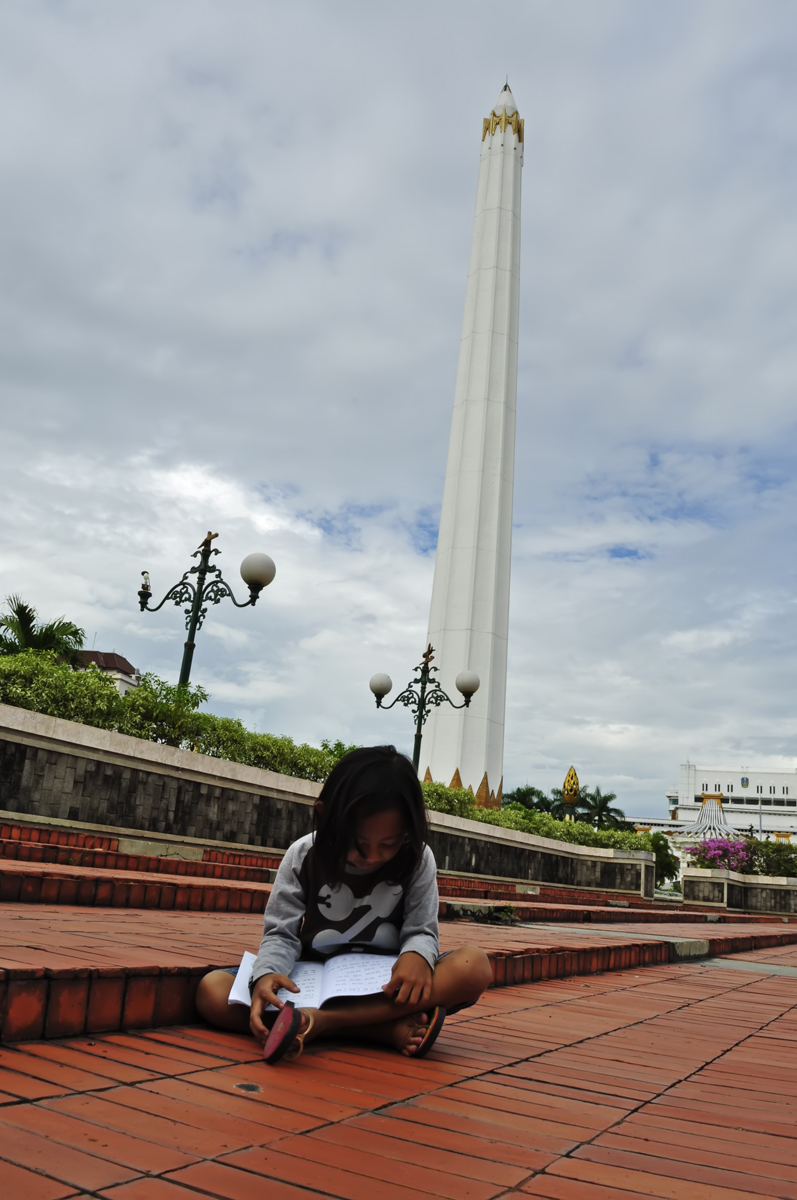

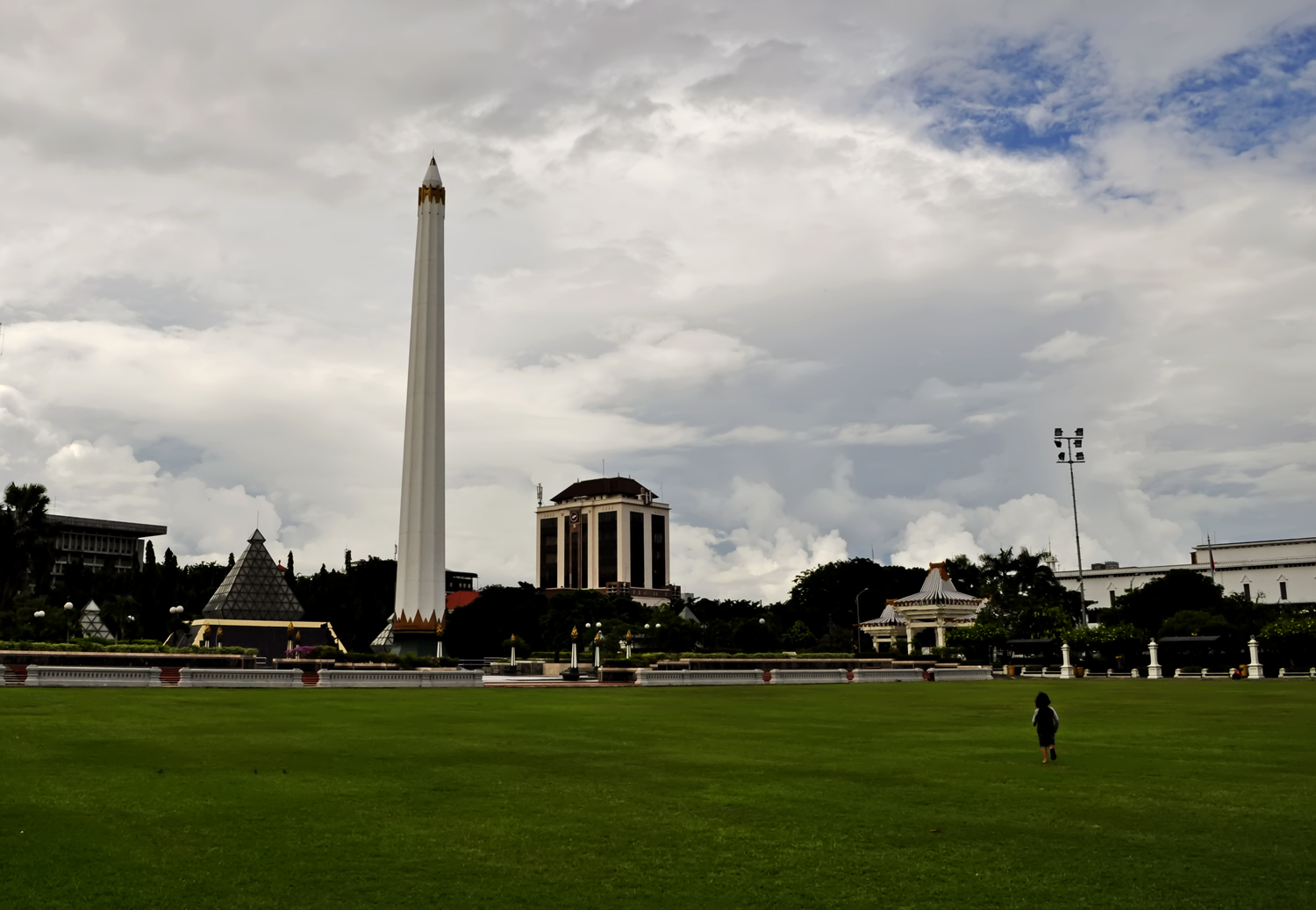

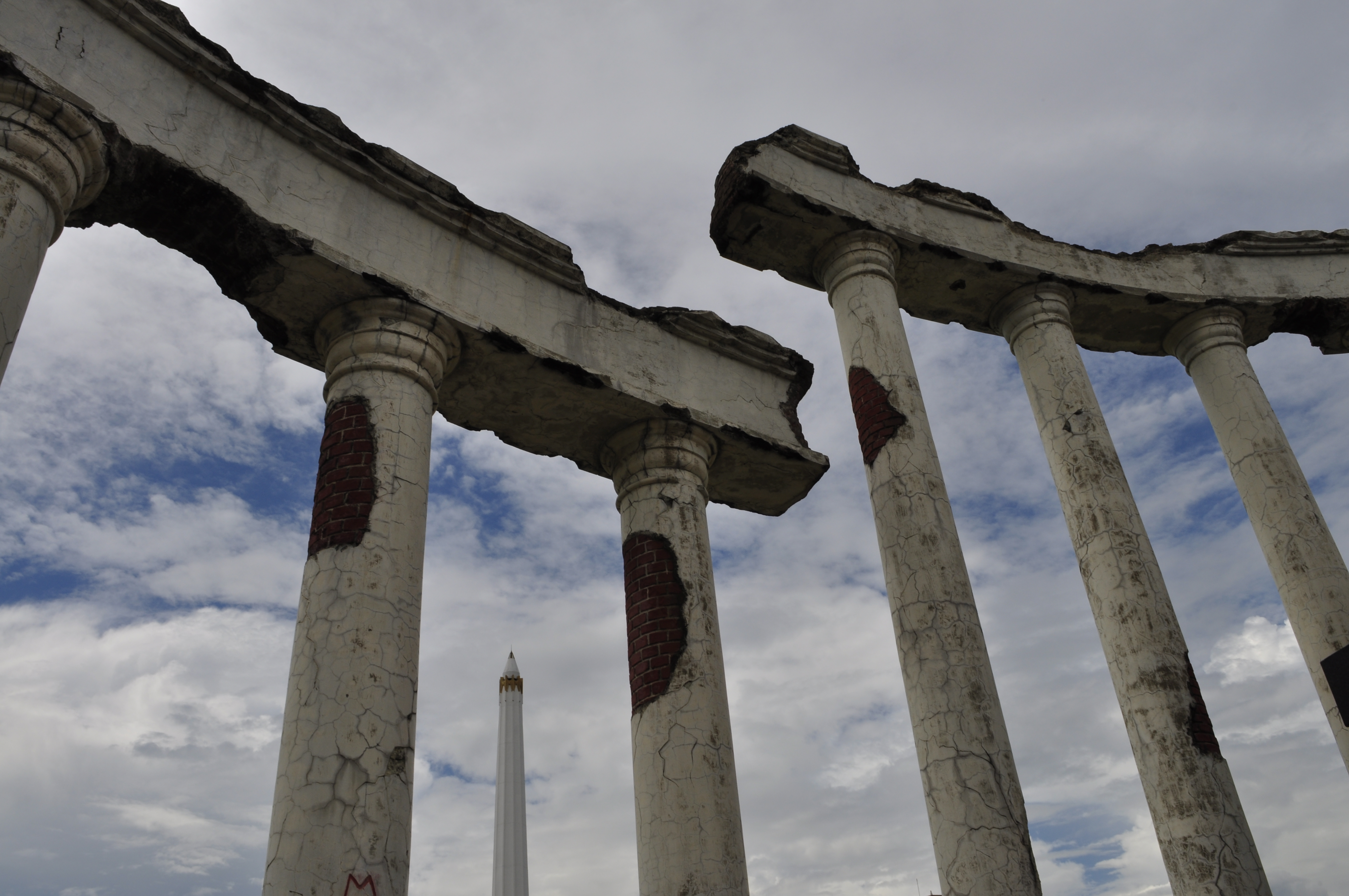

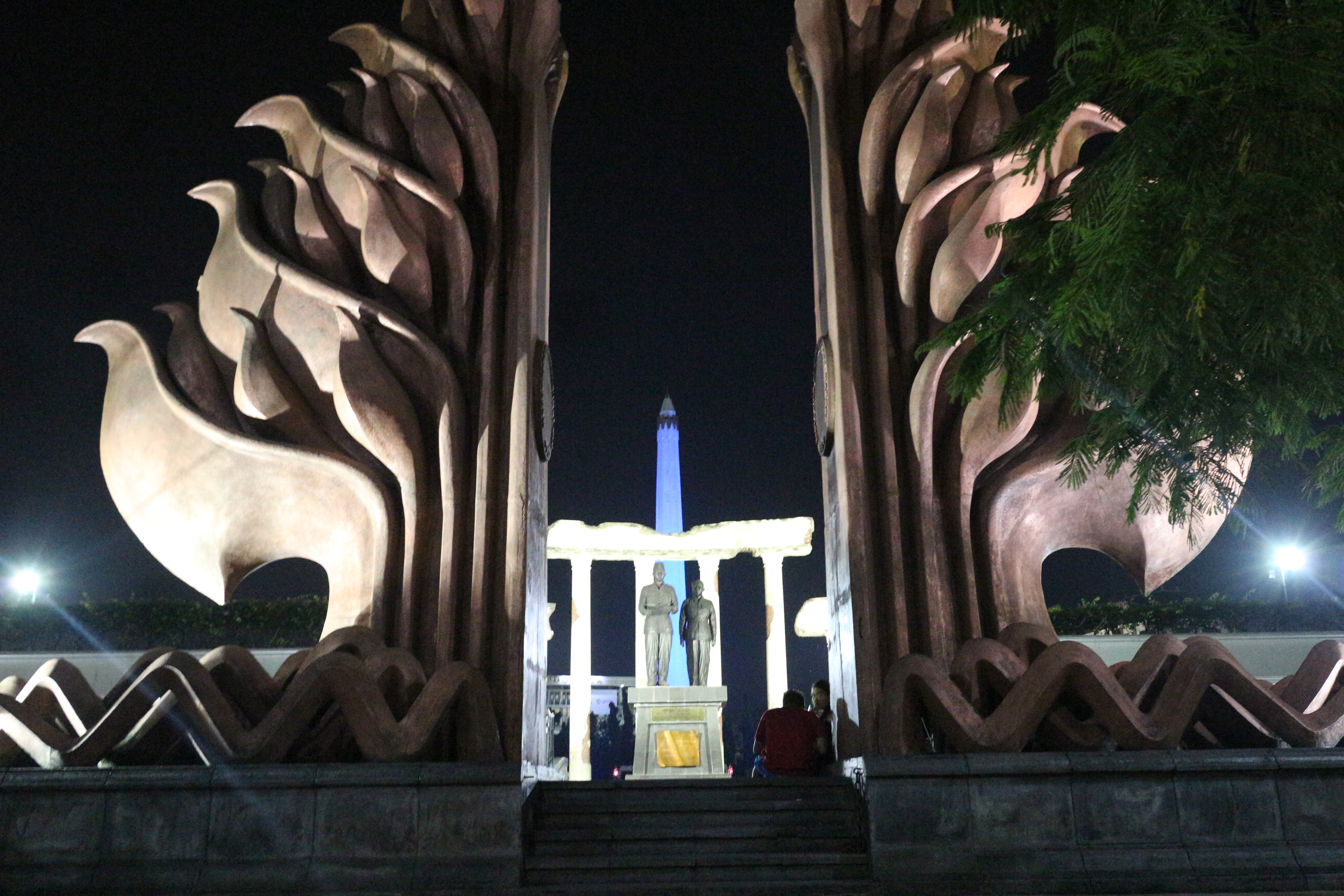

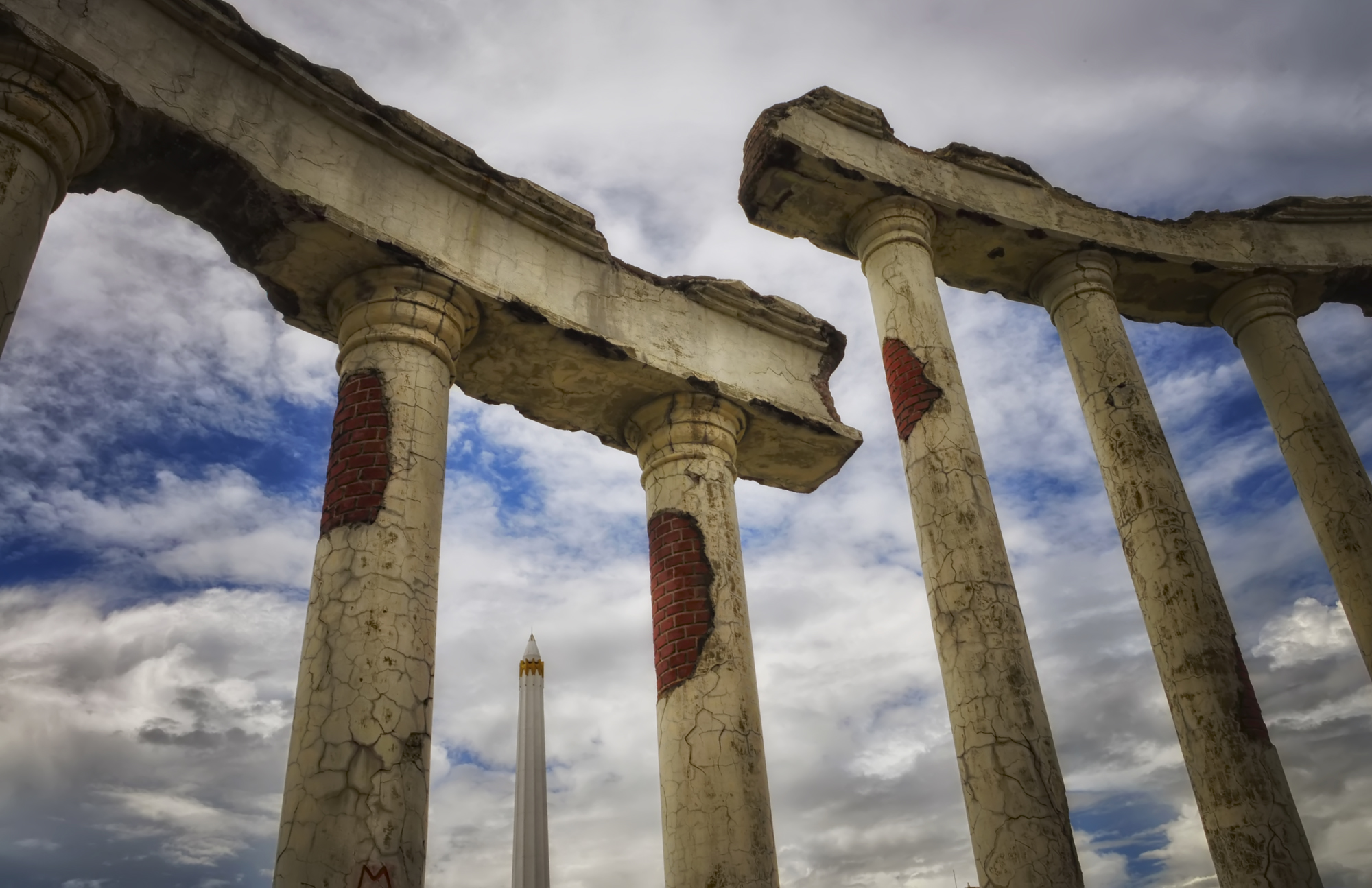

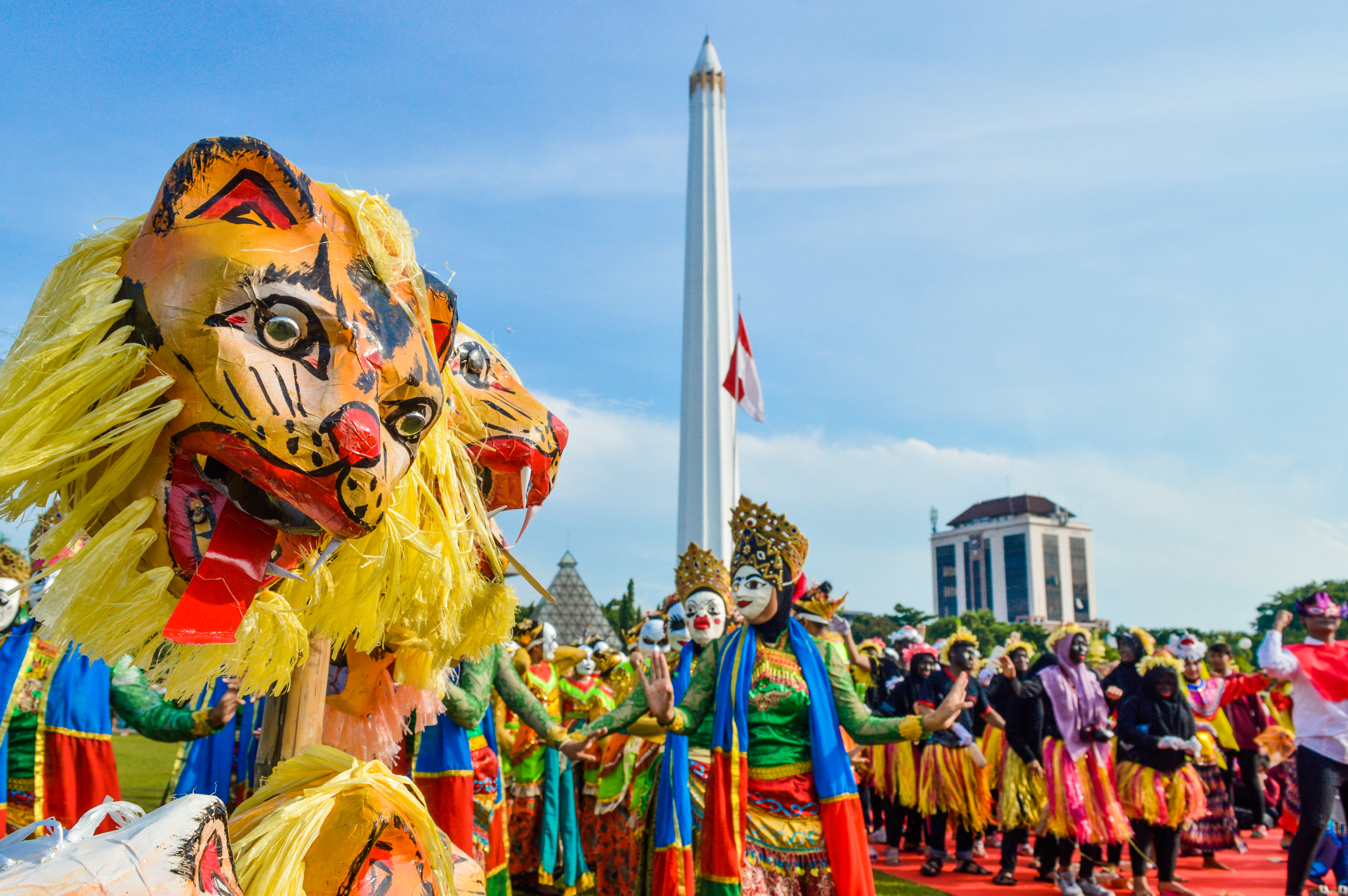

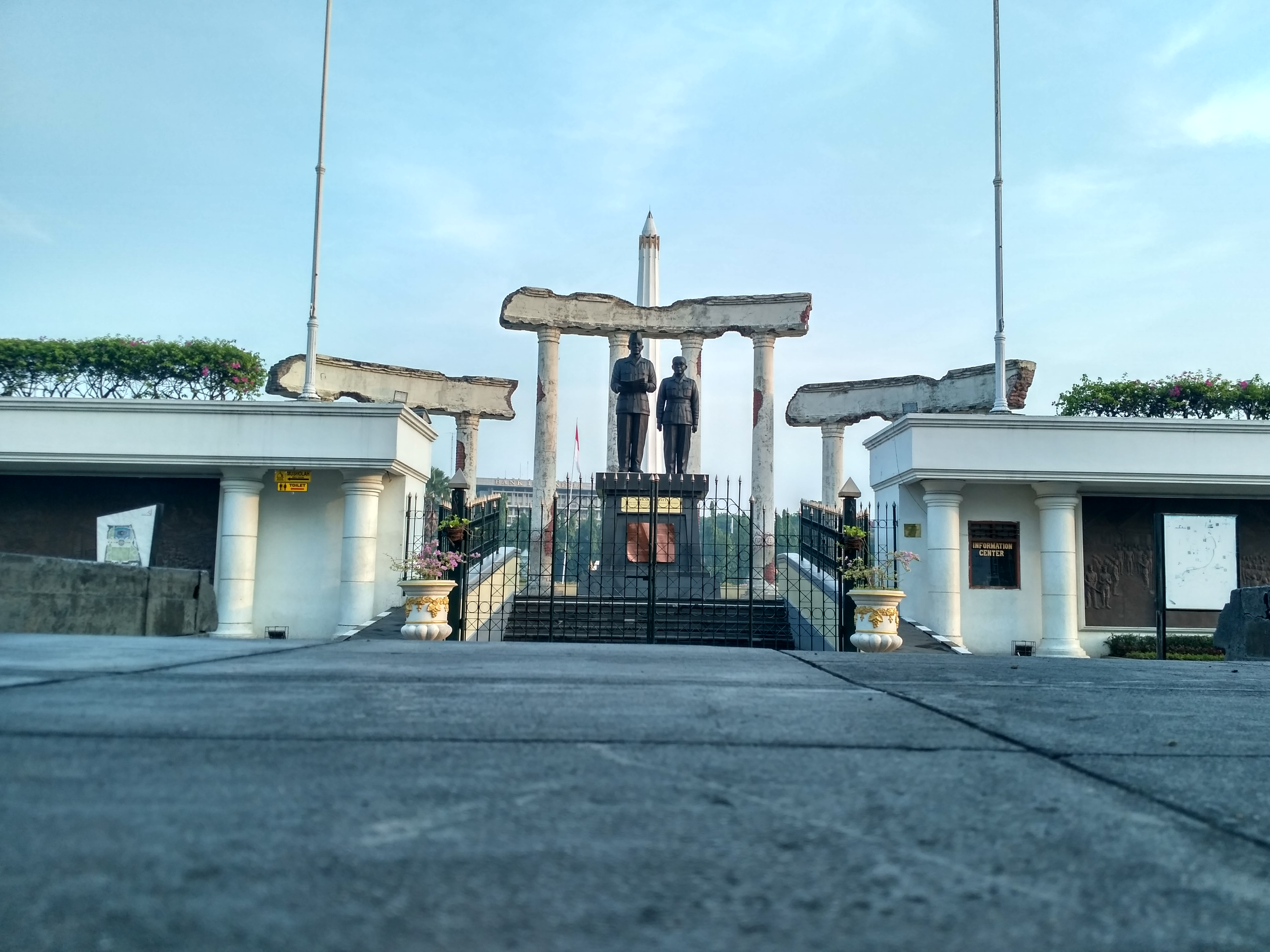

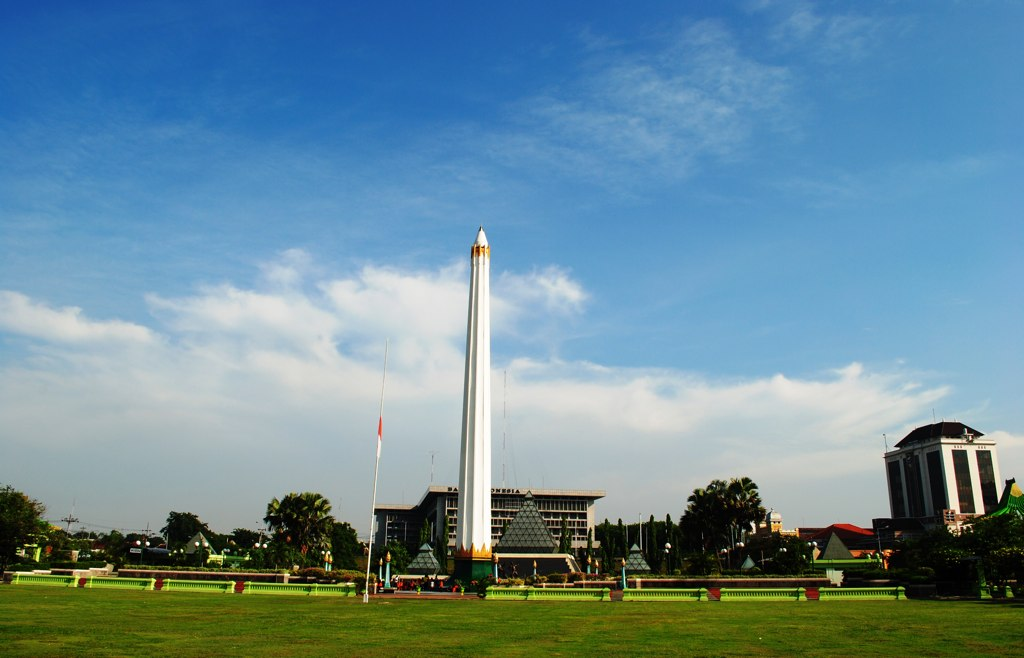

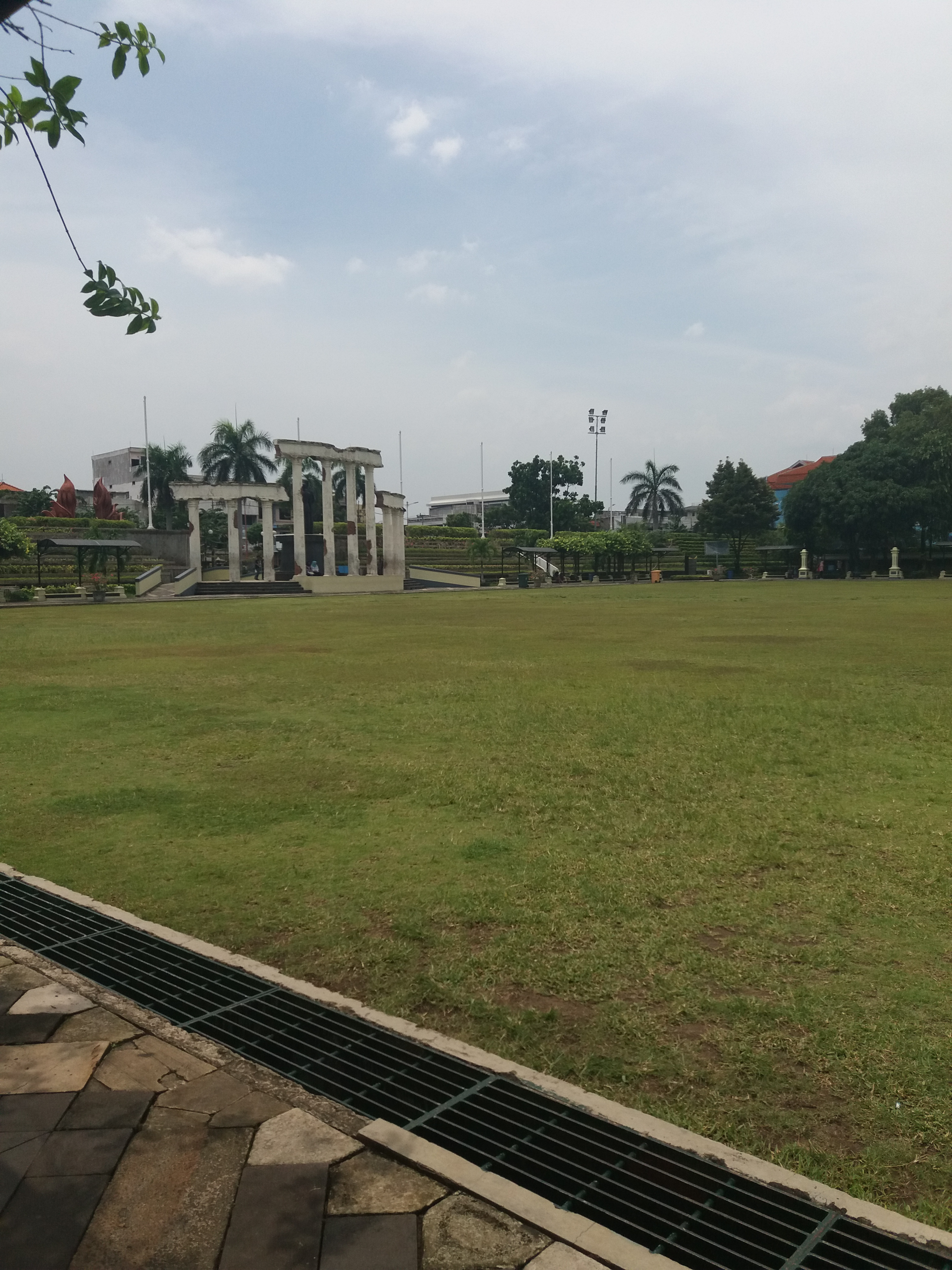

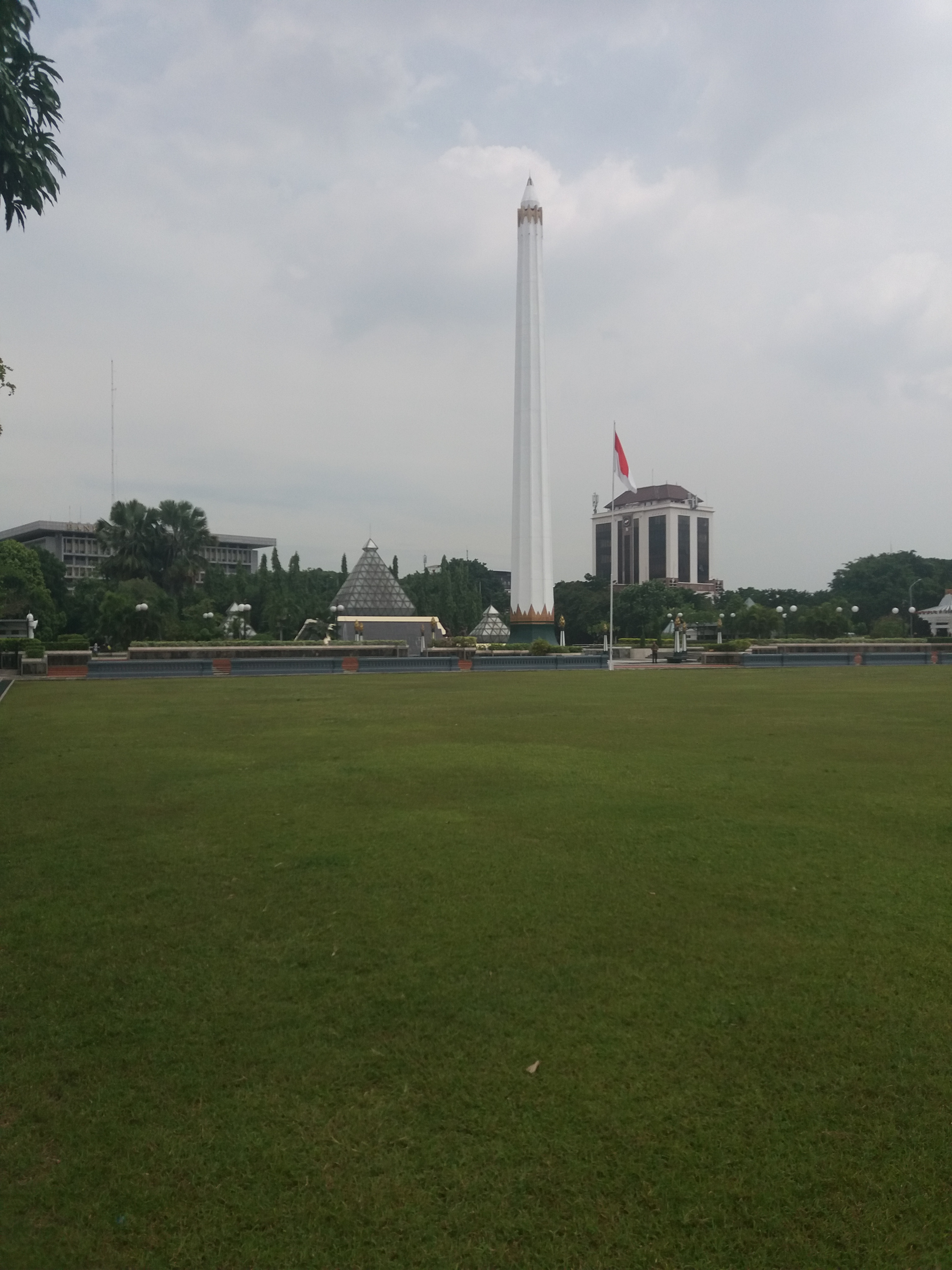

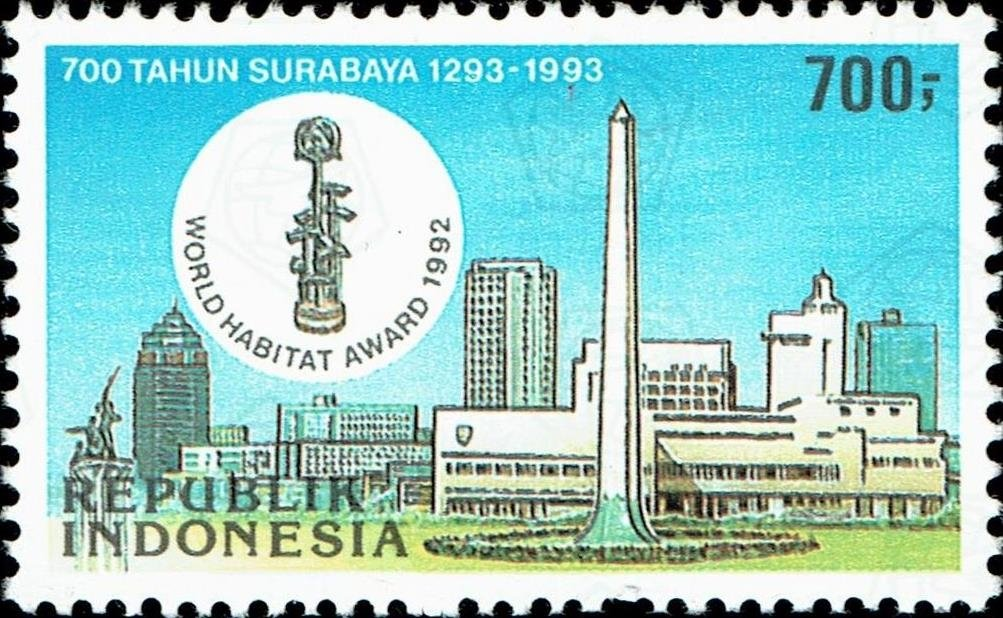
