= Tenggilis Mejoyo =

Tenggilis Mejoyo ꦠꦼꦁꦒꦶꦭꦶꦱ꧀ꦩꦗꦪ
- District (kecamatan)
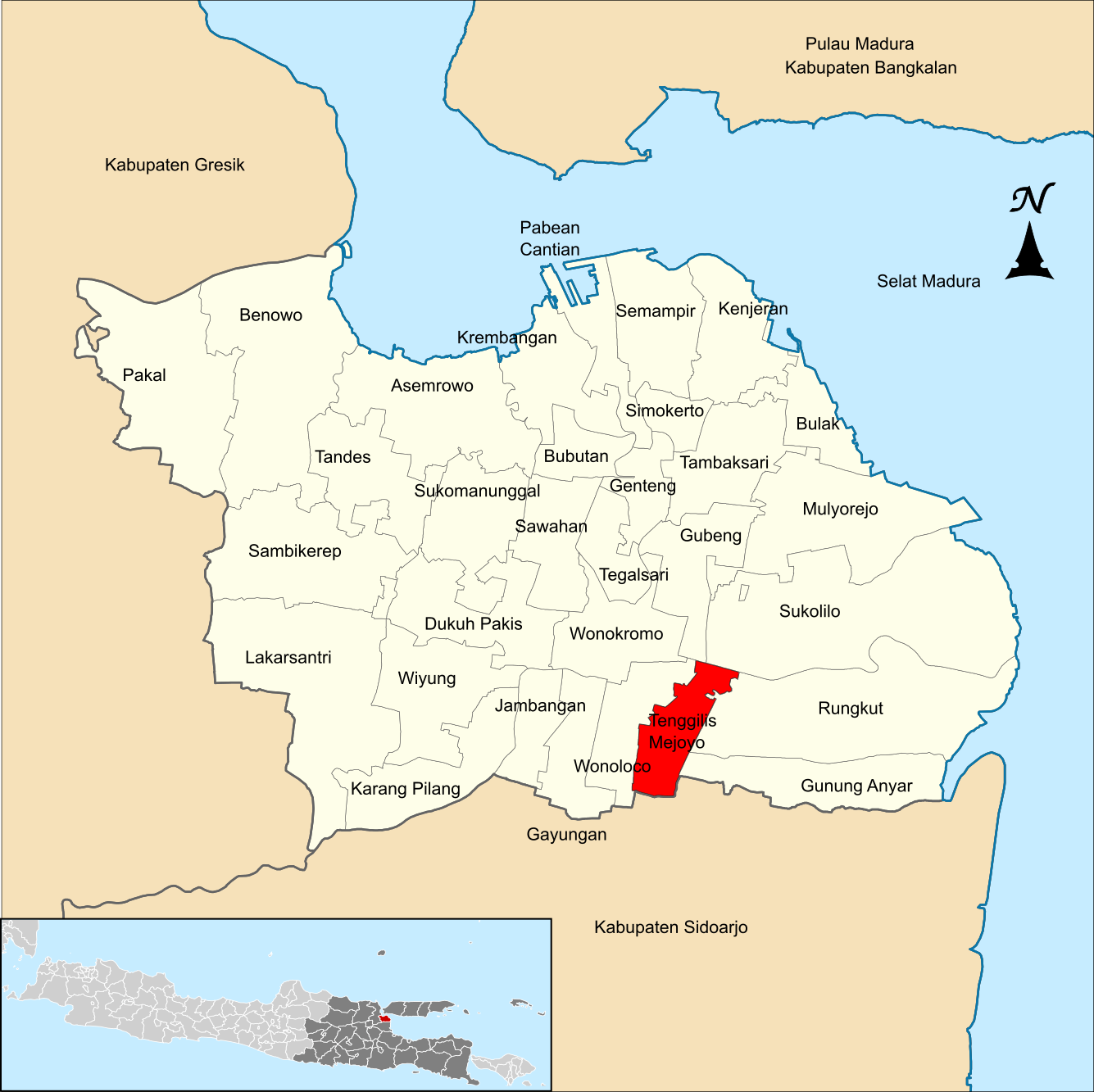
- Location of Tenggilis Mejoyo within Surabaya
- Interactive map of Tenggilis Mejoyo
- Country: Indonesia
- Province: East Java
- City: Surabaya
- Urban Villages: 4
- Postal code: 60292

Tenggilis Mejoyo is an administrative district (kecamatan) in the city of Surabaya, within Indonesia's East Java province, with an area of 5.81 square kilometres and a population of 58,932 in mid 2024.
