= 212 (disambiguation) =

212 is a year of the Julian calendar.

212 may also refer to:

- 212 BC
- 212 (number)
- 212 (album), an album by Neil Zaza
- "212" (song), a song by Azealia Banks
- 212 (missile), a Soviet cruise missile
- Area code 212, a North American Numbering Plan area code for most of the borough of Manhattan in New York City
- List of highways numbered 212
- December 2016 Jakarta protests, also known as the 212 Action
  - 212: The Power of Love, an Indonesian film about the protest
  - 212 Mart, a minimarket cooperative inspired from the protest
- Ferrari 212 F1, a single seater racing car
- 212

== See also ==
- 212th (disambiguation)
