= C212 =

C212 or variant, may refer to:

== Places ==
- Edenhope–Penola Road (C212), Victoria, Australia; see List of road routes in Victoria
- Edenhope Road (C212), South Australia, Australia; see List of road routes in South Australia
- Glenanne Road (C212), Northern Ireland, UK; a road abandoned in 2017, see List of statutory rules of Northern Ireland, 2017

== Vehicles ==
- CASA C-212 Aviocar, a turboprop STOL cargo plane
- New York City Subway car C212; a rail derrick car, see List of New York City Subway R-type contracts
- Siemens Inspiro Class C2.12, electric multiple unit train class
- SpaceX Crew Dragon Freedom (C212), a SpaceX Dragon 2 crew carrying space capsule

== Other uses ==
- Motorola C212, a cellphone; see List of Motorola Mobility products
- Cloacogenic carcinoma (C21.2); see International Classification of Diseases for Oncology

== See also ==
- 212 (disambiguation)
- C (disambiguation)
