= Hafiz Indonesia =

- Genre: Reality television Talent show Religion
- Presented by: Irfan Hakim
- Judges: Various
- Country of origin: Indonesia
- Original languages: Indonesian; Arabic
- No. of seasons: 15
- No. of episodes: 447

Production
- Executive producers: Adam Sugriwo (2013–2014); Saptono (2015–2018)
- Producers: Erwin A. Y. Raja (2013–2014); M. Zaedi Bafadal (2015–2020)
- Production location: Jakarta
- Camera setup: Multi-camera
- Running time: 120 minutes
- Production company: Media Nusantara Citra

Original release
- Network: RCTI
- Release: July 8, 2013 – present

Hafiz Indonesia is a religious talent search program aired on RCTI during Ramadan. This event is one of RCTI's flagship programs that showcases children's ability to recite and memorize a series of Quran.

The program received an award from the Indonesian Broadcasting Commission as Program Acara Ramadhan Terbaik (English: Best Ramadan Program) on August 7, 2014. Hafiz Indonesia won the Panasonic Gobel Awards for "Best Children's Program" for 2 consecutive years (2014 and 2015).

== Seasons ==
The first season of Hafiz Indonesia was held in 2013. The show aired every Monday-Friday at 14:30 WIB (2:30 pm) from July 8, 2013, to August 6, 2013. The first winner of Hafiz Indonesia 2013 is Hilya.

The 2nd season of Hafiz Indonesia aired every day at 14:00–16:00 WIB (2:00 pm – 4:00 pm) during Ramadan 1435/July 2014. Coming with a new format, 32 children from all over Indonesia showcased their ability to memorize and recite Quranic verses through 5 stages, namely:

- Stage Salamah (audition), (2013–2019)
- Stage Ikhtirah (audition), (2020–present)
- Stage Muqadimah (introducing), (2013–2020)
- Stage Ta'aruf (introducing), (2021–present)
- Stage Izaalah (elimination),
- Stage Syafa’at (wildcard),
- Stage Musabaqah (competition)
- Stage Wisuda Akbar (grand final).

This season the show is hosted by Irfan Hakim with four judges, namely Syeikh Ali Jaber, Prof. Dr. Nasaruddin Umar, Prof. Dr. Amir Faishol Fath, and Lulu Susanti. The best hafiz in 2014 was obtained by a 6-year-old participant from Bangka named Musa, who later became better known as Musa Hafiz kecil.

The event continued consecutively in 2015, 2016, 2017, 2018 and 2019. In general, each season has the format of the name Hafiz Indonesia [year], for example Hafiz Indonesia 2018.

In 2020, the audition round is known as Ikhtirah and there is no Intercession round. The Wildcard round was aired 1 day after Ikhtirah 4. Since 2017, the Jury was introduced Nabila Abdul Rahim Bayan.

== List seasons ==
Seasons	First Aired	Final Aired	Episodes
1	July 8, 2013	August 6, 2013	30
2	June 28, 2014	July 25, 2014	28
3	June 18, 2015	July 16, 2015	29
4	May 30, 2016	July 5, 2016	37
5	May 22, 2017	June 21, 2017	31
6	May 14, 2018	June 14, 2018	32
7	April 29, 2019	June 6, 2019	39
8	April 20, 2020	May 23, 2020	34
9	April 12, 2021	May 12, 2021	31
10	April 2, 2022	May 2, 2022	31
11	March 20, 2023	April 21, 2023	33
12	March 9, 2024	April 9, 2024	32
13	March 1, 2025	March 30, 2025	30
14	February 19, 2026	March 20, 2026	30
15	February TBA, 2027	March TBA, 2027	30
Total All Episodes			447

== Judges ==
Years	Seasons	Presenters	Judges						
Years	Seasons	Presenters	1	2	3	4	5	6	7
2013	1	Irfan Hakim	Bachtiar Nasir	Lulu Susanti	Cecep Maulana	Riza Muhammad	N/A	N/A	N/A
2014	2	Irfan Hakim	Sheikh Ali Jaber	Lulu Susanti	Amir Faishol Fath	Nasaruddin Umar	N/A	N/A	N/A
2015	3	Irfan Hakim	Sheikh Ali Jaber	Lulu Susanti	Amir Faishol Fath	N/A	N/A	N/A	N/A
2016	4	Irfan Hakim	Sheikh Ali Jaber	Lulu Susanti	Amir Faishol Fath	N/A	N/A	N/A	N/A
2017	5	Irfan Hakim	Sheikh Ali Jaber	Nabila Abdul Rahim Bayan	Amir Faishol Fath	N/A	N/A	N/A	N/A
2018	6	Irfan Hakim	Sheikh Ali Jaber	Nabila Abdul Rahim Bayan	Amir Faishol Fath	Syekh Abdul Karim Al-Makki	N/A	N/A	N/A
2019	7	Irfan Hakim	Bachtiar Nasir	Nabila Abdul Rahim Bayan	Amir Faishol Fath	Habib Nabil Al Musawwa	N/A	N/A	N/A
2020	8	Irfan Hakim	Syekh Ahmad Al- Misry	Nabila Abdul Rahim Bayan	Amir Faishol Fath	Syekh Abdul Karim Al-Makki	Sheikh Ali Jaber	Syekh Thyazen Al Hakimi	N/A
2021	9	Irfan Hakim	Syekh Ahmad Al- Misry	Nabila Abdul Rahim Bayan	Amir Faishol Fath	N/A	N/A	N/A	N/A
2022	10	Irfan Hakim	Syekh Hussein Jaber	Nabila Abdul Rahim Bayan	Amir Faishol Fath	N/A	N/A	N/A	N/A
2023	11	Irfan Hakim	Syekh Hussein Jaber	Nabila Abdul Rahim Bayan	Amir Faishol Fath	N/A	N/A	N/A	N/A
2024	12	Irfan Hakim	Syekh Hussein Jaber	Nabila Abdul Rahim Bayan	Dennis Lim	Ustadz Kasif Heer	Lulu Susanti	N/A	N/A
2025	13	Irfan Hakim	Abi Amir Faishol Fath	Nabila Abdul Rahim Bayan	Dennis Lim	Das'ad Latif	Taufiqurrahman	Subki Al-Bughury	N/A
2026	14	Irfan Hakim	Nabila Abdul Rahim Bayan	Dennis Lim	Taufiqurrahman	Mamah Dedeh	Muzammil Hasballah	Ahmad Slamet Ibnu Syam	Munawir Ngacir
2027	15	Irfan Hakim							

== Winners ==
=== Winners from seasons ===
Years	Champions				
Years	1st	2nd	3rd	4th	5th
2013	Hilya Jakarta	Farid Lampung	Rifa Jakarta	Raihan Central Java	
2014	Musa Bangka Belitung	Aza Jambi	Fu’adi West Nusa Tenggara	Denisa West Java	Abiw West Java
2015	Aulia Central Java	Askar Aceh	Miftah Aceh	Neneng West Java	Hafizh North Sumatra
2016	Ahsani West Java	Desofwa West Java	Unaysa Yogyakarta	Aja Naken North Sumatra	Aidah West Sumatra
2017	Ahmad Central Java	Enri North Maluku	Kamil Central Java	Zahra West Java	Farhan North Sumatra
2018	Aida East Java	Muslim Saudi Arabia	Aisyah South Sumatra	Wahib South Sulawesi	Rais East Kalimantan
2019	Annisa Riau	Humaira Riau	Zuhrah South Sulawesi	Arim East Java	Naja West Nusa Tenggara
2020	Afiqah North Kalimantan	Azka Jakarta	Icha East Java	Ahmad Southeast Sulawesi	Ula Egypt
2021	Aqeelah East Java	Rayyan Jambi	Khansa Bangka Belitung Islands	Yusuf Aceh	Fawwaz South Sumatra
2022	Lukman New Zealand	Nadhif East Java	Billy Jakarta	Hanny South Sumatra	Haura East Kalimantan
2023	Akil Riau	Sulaiman Egypt	Kautsar Central Java	Ibam South Sumatra	Hasna Riau Islands
2024	Gibran North Sumatra	Yukiko West Java	Arfan Riau Islands	Calvin West Java	Zubair East Java
2025	Yasmin East Java	Naufal Australia	Izzah North Maluku	Mora East Java	Hamzah Egypt
2026	Rahman West Sumatra	Shanum Riau	Raisa West Java	Syeikha South Sumatra	Elfath Lampung
2027	TBA	TBA	TBA	TBA	TBA

=== Category winners ===
Years	Category					
Years	Afshah	Ajwad	Aqwa	Ahfadz	Ajmal	Akram
2017	Farhan	Enri	Kamil	Ahmad	Zahra	
2018	Aida	Aisyah	Wahib	Hamzah	Kayla	
2019	Salwaa	Arim	Naja	Annisa	Humaira	
2020	Filza	Hanif	Azka	Hafidz	Afiqah	Ahmad
2021	Rayyan	Aqeelah	Khansa	Yusuf	Fawwaz	Ainun
2022	Lukman	Shasha	Billy	Hanny	Haura	Hanny
2023	Asma	Nadia Inara	Akil	Hafizhah	Farid	Kautsar
2024	Gibran	Yukiko	Arfan	Zayyan	Azka	Calvin
2025	Hamzah	Yasmin	Naufal	Aly	Izzah	Mora
2026	Fatih	Rahman	Raisa	Izzy	Shanum	Al Kindi
2027						

==== Notes ====
- The winner of the 2013 season only made the top four
- Lukman's victory in 2022 marks the end of the A prefix as the winner for the past 7 years (2015–2021), it is also the first year that the first-place winner is a foreigner.
- Yasmin is the first champion of Hafiz Indonesia whose also a person with disabilities.
- Hanny is the first participant with 2 Category Winners at once (Ahfadz & Akram)
- Ahsani, Ahmad, and Annisa are the winners of Hafiz Indonesia with 30 Juz of Qur'an memorization.

== Achievements ==
Year	Award	Category	Result
2014	Anugerah Komisi Penyiaran Indonesia 2014	Best Children's Program	Nominated
2014	Panasonic Gobel Awards 2014	Children's Program	Won
2015	Panasonic Gobel Awards 2015	Kids Program & Animation	Won
2015	Penghargaan Program Siaran Ramadhan 2015	Talent Show	Nominated
2017	Indonesian Television Awards 2017	Most Popular Ramadan Programs	Won
2017	Anugerah Komisi Penyiaran Indonesia 2017	Best Children's Program	Nominated
2018	Indonesian Television Awards 2018	Most Popular Ramadan Programs	Won
2018	Anugerah Syiar Ramadhan 1439 H	Talent Search	Won
2019	Indonesian Television Awards 2019	Most Popular Ramadan Programs	Won
2019	Anugerah Komisi Penyiaran Indonesia 2019	Best Children's Program	Nominated
2020	Indonesian Television Awards 2020	The Most Popular Non-Drama Ramadan Programs	Won
2021	Indonesian Television Awards 2021	The Most Popular Non-Drama Ramadan Programs	Won
2021	Anugerah Komisi Penyiaran Indonesia 2021	Best Children's Program	Nominated
2022	Anugerah Syiar Ramadan 2022	Talent Event	Won
2022	Indonesian Television Awards 2022	The Most Popular Non-Drama Ramadan Programs	Won
2023	Indonesian Television Awards 2023	The Most Popular Non-Drama Ramadan Programs	Won
2024	Anugerah Syiar Ramadan 2024	Best Talent Search	Won
2024	Indonesian Television Awards 2024	The Most Popular Non-Drama Ramadan Programs	Won
2025	Indonesian Television Awards 2025	The Most Popular Non-Drama Ramadan Programs	Won
