= 212th Brigade =

212th Brigade may refer to:

- 212th Airborne Brigade, Soviet Union
- 212th Brigade (United Kingdom)
- 212th Brigade, Royal Field Artillery, United Kingdom
- 212th Field Artillery Brigade, United States

== See also ==
- 212th Division (disambiguation)
