= December 2016 Jakarta protests =

Mass protest by Islamist group in Indonesia

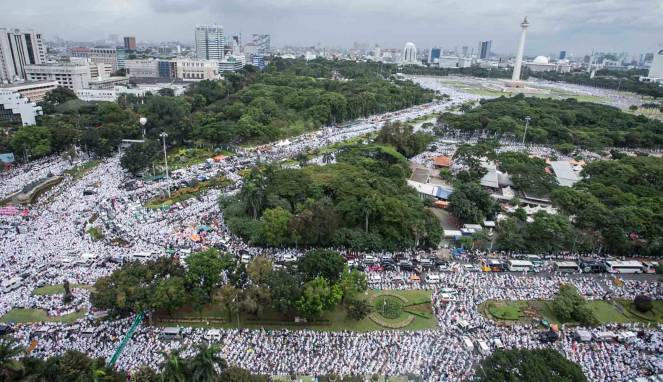
Aerial view of the protest

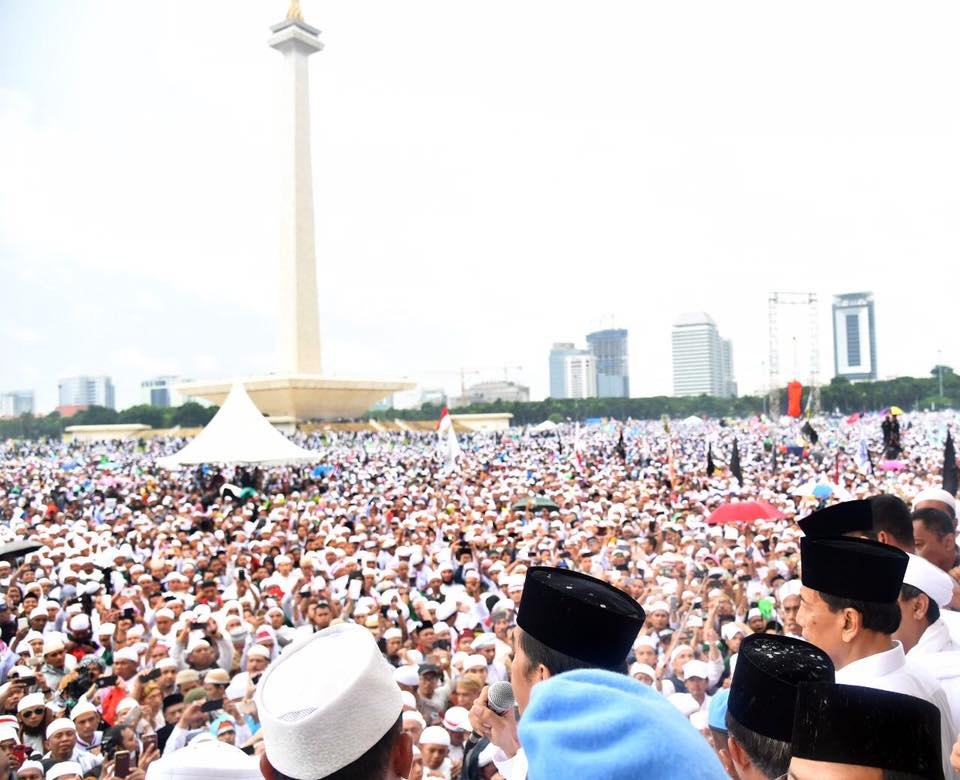
President Joko Widodo addressing the protest.

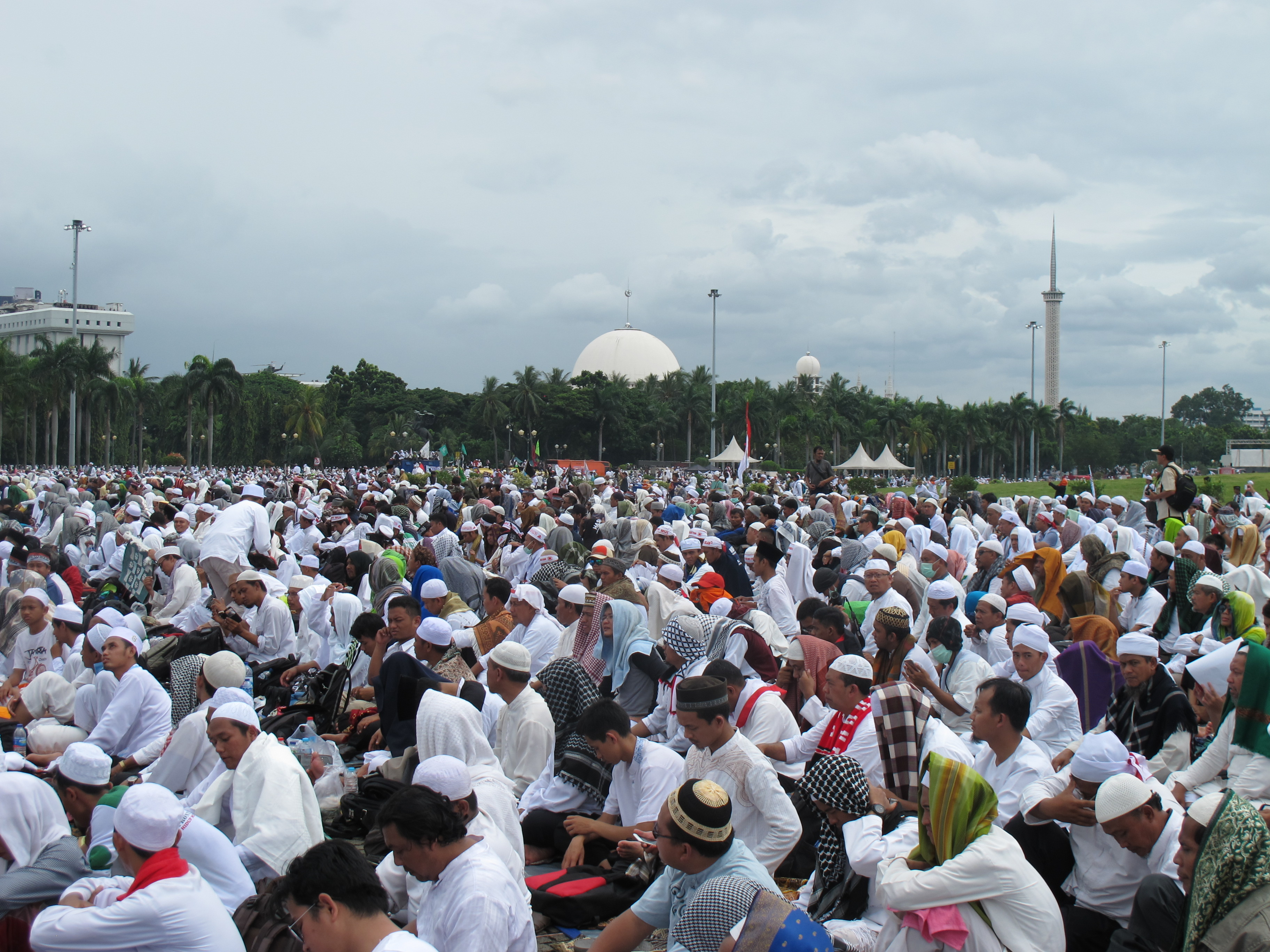
Scene of the protest at the Merdeka Square

December 2016 Jakarta protests, also known as the 3rd Defend Islam Action (Indonesian: Aksi Bela Islam III), 212 Movement, or simply as 212 Action, was a mass protest led by Islamist groups which took place on 2 December 2016, in Jakarta, Indonesia. During the protest, marchers demanded the termination of the gubernatorial office held by Basuki Tjahaja Purnama (Ahok), who had been accused of blasphemy. The protest was the second demonstration against Ahok in 2016 following the previous rally which took place on 4 November, and it was succeeded by the February 2017 Jakarta protests.

== Background ==
The incumbent governor of Jakarta, Basuki Tjahaja Purnama, who was contesting for the forthcoming 2017 Jakarta gubernatorial election, was accused of blasphemy against Islam following his speech on 27 September 2016. National outcry against his perceived misdemeanor had triggered a small scale protest on 14 October and a nationwide protest in November 2016, the later reported widely among the international media. Many considered it a crisis of democracy and conservatism among Islam in Indonesia. Facing the counter-protest by the pro-Ahok groups on 30 November, the oppositions and Islamist groups jointly planned for an even wider scale and more inclusive protest.

== Protest ==
Initially, the protest was planned to be held on 25 November 2016 but then it was agreed to be held on 2 December. The National Movement to Guard Fatwa of the Indonesian Ulema Council (GNPF-MUI), the main organizer of the 4 November protest, said it would hold a similar action again on 2 December 2016. The leader of Islamic Defenders Front (FPI), Muhammad Rizieq Shihab said that this action would take place with the extra commitment for nonviolence as it will be held in the form of joint worship. This statement received mixed responses. The chairman of the House of Representatives, Ade Komaruddin chose not to respond to the statement and requested reporters to ask directly to the organizers. The police chief Tito Karnavian threatened not to issue permission for the action upon fear of going violent. After an agreement between the organizers and the police, the action was agreed to take place with activities in the form of praying and the joint performance of Friday prayers.

The protest was held at the Merdeka Square surrounding the National Monument in Central Jakarta. The number of attendees ranged from 200,000 (police claims) to 7.5 millions (organizers' claims). From video evidence scattered across various social media and video sharing websites via drone camera, it can be seen that the mass extends to the main road of Hotel Indonesia Roundabout. During the protest, a number of activities were carried out, including praying and joint Friday prayers. The president of Indonesia Joko Widodo attended the event and was warmly welcomed by the participants. Among the celebrities who joined the protest, there were Ardian Syaf, the prominent Indonesian comic artist, and Wijayanto, the pop Islamic preacher. Other prominent figures who joined the protest includes Hidayat Nur Wahid, deputy chairman of the House of Representatives.

== Aftermath ==
Basuki later lost the elections to Anies Baswedan and was found guilty, being sentenced to 2 years on 9 May 2017. On the protests' anniversary, a “reunion” rally was held in the same location.

The Sharia minimarket chain 212 Mart, was established in May 2017 was named in honour of the protests, and by August 2018 had 192 stores.

The event was later depicted in a 2018 film, 212: The Power of Love.

In 2020, shortly after Muhammad Rizieq Shihab’s return to Indonesia, local police stated that they are not giving permits for the group to gather for a reunion due to the COVID-19 pandemic; should they do such, they are at risk of being disbanded.

The protests notably marked the rise of Islamism and Islamic fundamentalism among some of Indonesia's Muslim society, with many newer Islamist organizations, social media communities and political parties (such as the Ummah Party) having emerged in the years following the protests, along with an uptick of hate speech and discrimination against religious minorities, particularly Christians. In addition, Islamist-linked bombings took place in two churches in Surabaya in 2018.

== See also ==
- 2016–17 Jakarta protests
