= 2018 anti-ICERD rally =

Malaysian right wing rally against ratification of UN convention ICERD

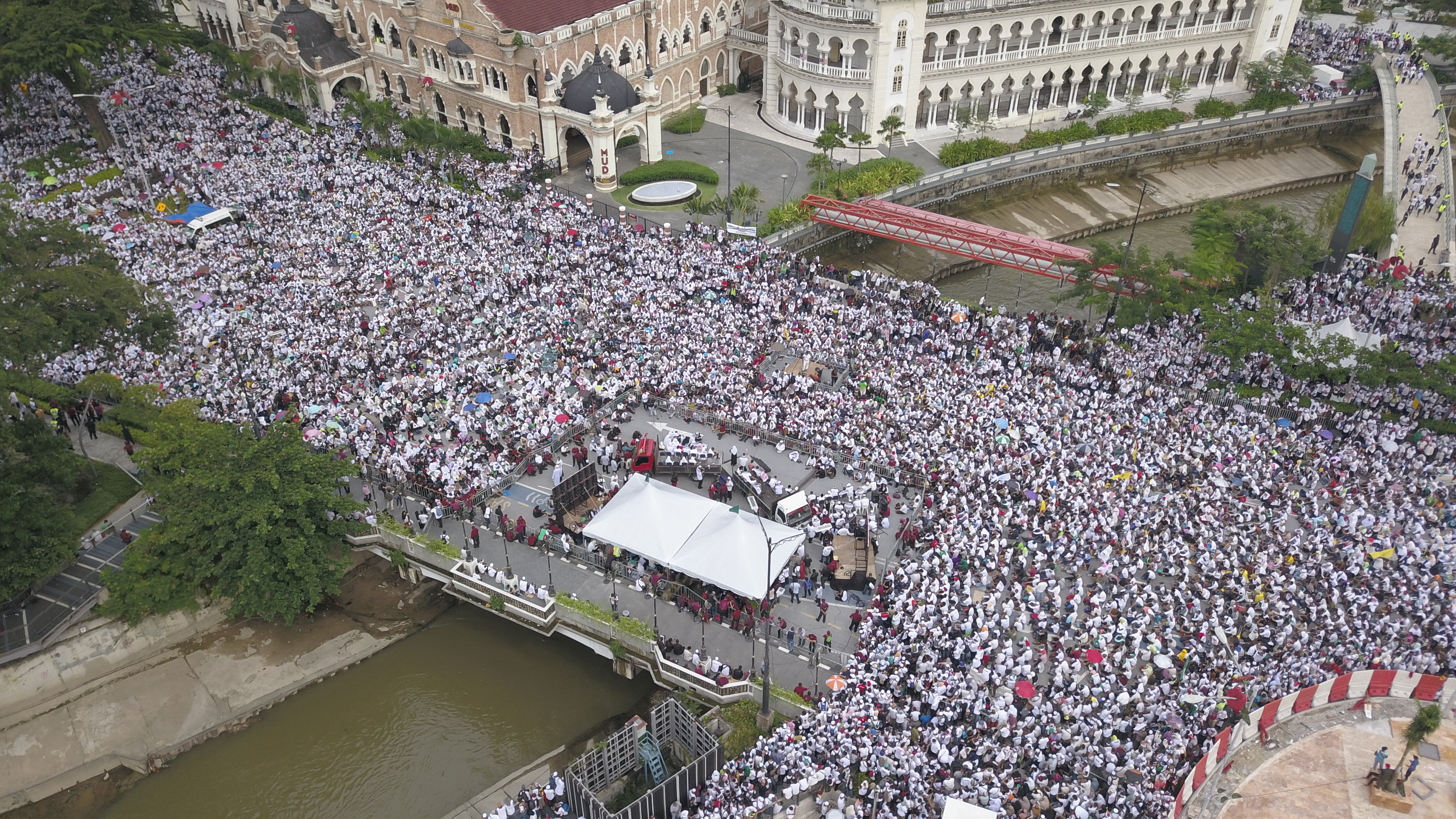
- A bird's-eye-view of the protest at its peak.
- Date: 8 December 2018
- Location: Dataran Merdeka, Kuala Lumpur
- Caused by: Protest against ratifying the International Convention on the Elimination of All Forms of Racial Discrimination (ICERD)
- Methods: Demonstration, praying (salat and dua), speeches

Parties
Malaysian Islamic Party (PAS); United Malays National Organisation (UMNO); Malaysian Muslim Solidarity; Gerakan Pembela Ummah other NGOs	Government of Malaysia

Lead figures
Ahmad Zahid Hamidi; Mohamad Hasan; Ismail Sabri Yaakob; Abdul Hadi Awang; Tuan Ibrahim Tuan Man; Takiyuddin Hassan; Aminuddin Yahya	Mahathir Mohamad; Waytha Moorthy Ponnusamy

Number
500,000 (organisers estimate); 55,000 (police estimate)	

The Anti-ICERD (International Convention on the Elimination of All Forms of Racial Discrimination) Rally or Himpunan Aman Bantah ICERD (Malay) or Himpunan 812 ("The 8th of December Rally") was a rally held in Dataran Merdeka, Kuala Lumpur, Malaysia on 8 December 2018. The rally was organised by opposition Islamist political parties Malaysian Islamic Party (PAS) and United Malays National Organisation (UMNO), with the support of various non-governmental organisations.

The rally was held in response to the new Malaysian government's plan to ratify the United Nations convention known as the International Convention on the Elimination of All Forms of Racial Discrimination (ICERD). The opposition parties from UMNO and PAS seriously deny the ratification of the convention, as they alleged such ratification was contrary to the Constitution of Malaysia. The argument that this was contrary to the Federal Constitution was strongly opposed by most leading constitutional legal scholars in the country. The constitution recognizes special rights for the Malay and Bumiputra. Even though the government announced that it would not ratify the convention on 23 November 2018, the organiser decided to push on with the rally and shifted its main focus towards celebrating the government's decision on not ratifying ICERD.

== Background ==
The International Convention on the Elimination of All Forms of Racial Discrimination (ICERD) is a United Nations convention which commits its members to the elimination of racial discrimination and the promotion of understanding among all races. Malaysia is one of the 18 countries in the world that have not ratified this convention. It is also one of the two Muslim-majority countries that have yet to ratify it, along with Brunei. On 28 September 2018, the prime minister Tun Dr. Mahathir bin Mohamad addressed the UN General Assembly, announcing the new government has to "ratify all remaining core UN instruments related to the protection of human rights", including ICERD and other five unratified conventions. However, Khairy Jamaluddin disputed the UN address and raised concerns about ICERD's impact on bumiputra, Malay and Islam privileges and special treatment in the country. On 19 November 2018, in Parliament, Waytha Moorthy, who is in charge of National Unity and Social Wellbeing, started speaking on the intention of the government in ratifying ICERD and said that consultations with relevant stakeholders would be held in the first quarter of 2019, to the Opposition's denunciations.

== Participants ==
While the organizers set a target of half-million people to attend the rally, the Kuala Lumpur police's official figures estimated 55,000 people attended the rally (mostly PAS supporters), including PAS president Abdul Hadi Awang and former prime minister Najib Razak. In Kelantan, the state government declared a public holiday on the next day (9 December 2018) to allow Kelantanese people to attend the rally in Kuala Lumpur. The organisers, however, claimed that the number of participants reached more than 300,000 based on their estimation.

Far right organization Malaysian Muslim Solidarity or known by its Malay acronym ISMA is a key organizer. Its members admits inspiration from the 2017 "Aksi 212" protests in which Indonesian Islamist hardliners rally against the appointment of Basuki Tjahaja Purnama –of Chinese descent– as the governor of Jakarta. One of its figure leaders Bachtiar Nasir was invited as a virtual guest in one of ISMA's convention two weeks, and the rally was nicknamed "812" following the Jakarta rally's naming convention in affiliated media on the subsequent days.

== Rally ==
On the day of the rally before the rally started at 2 pm, the silat alliance Pertubuhan Gabungan Silat Pertahan Perlembagaan (PERTAHAN) submitted a memorandum to the Yang Di-Pertuan Agong to express their protest over ICERD and other issues.

The rally started at 2 pm with mass crowds marching to Dataran Merdeka from Masjid Negara, Masjid Jamek and Sogo complex and ended early at 5 pm due to heavy rain.

== Aftermath ==
On 23 November 2018, the Prime Minister's Office announced they would not ratify the convention and would continue defending the Federal Constitution, which they said represents a social contract that was agreed upon by all races during the formation of the country.
