= Straffeloven =

Straffeloven may refer to:

- Danish Penal Code
- Norwegian Penal Code
