= The Jewish community of Oslo et al. v. Norway =

The Jewish community of Oslo et al. v. Norway (Communication No. 30/2003) was a case decided by the UN Committee on the Elimination of Racial Discrimination in 2005.

The case involved an antisemitic speech given during a march in commemoration of the Nazi leader Rudolf Hess. The Supreme Court of Norway acquitted the giver of the speech, and found that penalizing approval of Nazism would involve prohibiting Nazi organizations, which it considered would go too far and be incompatible with the right to freedom of speech.

Afterwards the Committee on the Elimination of Racial Discrimination found that the acquittal by the Supreme Court of Norway was a violation of article 4 of the International Convention on the Elimination of All Forms of Racial Discrimination. As such, the UN Committee found that the speaker's comments contained ideas of racial superiority and hatred, making the speech "exceptionally offensive" and not protected by the right to freedom of expression.

== Background and case results ==
In 2000, a group known as the "Bootboys" organized a march in commemoration of Rudolf Hess, near Oslo. There was an antisemitic speech by the march's leader Terje Sjølie, the Nazi salute was made and "Sieg Heil" shouted.

Some witnesses filed a complaint with the police, and Sjølie was charged with a violation of section 135a of the Norwegian Penal Code (threatening, insulting, or subjecting to hatred, persecution or contempt, any person or group of persons because of their creed, race, color or national or ethnic origin).

Sjølie was initially acquitted by the Halden City Court, then convicted by the Borgarting Court of Appeal. He was finally acquitted again by the Supreme Court in an 11-6 decision on 17 December 2002.

The Supreme Court of Norway found that penalizing approval of Nazism would involve prohibiting Nazi organizations, which it considered would go too far and be incompatible with the right to freedom of speech. The majority held that the speech contained derogatory and offensive remarks, but that no actual threats were made, nor any instructions to carry out any particular actions.

== CERD proceedings and opinion ==
On 17 June 2003, representatives of the Jewish community and the Norwegian Antiracist Centre filed a communication before CERD.

On 9 March 2005, the Committee declared the communication admissible.

On 15 August 2005, it delivered the decision. The Committee reaffirmed that the prohibition of all ideas based upon racial superiority or hatred is compatible with the right to freedom of opinion and expression and concluded that the statements of Mr. Sjolie [sic], given that they were of exceptionally/manifestly offensive character, are not protected by the due regard clause, and that accordingly his acquittal by the Supreme Court of Norway gave rise to a violation of article 4, and consequently article 6, of the Convention (Para 10.5).

Significant conclusions include also that the deference to Hitler and his principles and 'footsteps' must in the Committee's view be taken as incitement at least to racial discrimination, if not to violence (Para 10.4).

With the trial, the Committee on the Elimination of Racial Discrimination found that the statements in question "ideas based upon racial superiority or hatred," and that "the deference to Hitler and his principles and 'footsteps' must ...be taken as incitement at least to racial discrimination, if not to violence. As such, the "exceptionally/manifestly offensive" statements were not protected by the due regard clause. It found as such, that the acquittal by the Supreme Court of Norway was a violation of article 4 of the International Convention on the Elimination of All Forms of Racial Discrimination.

=== Adopted standard ===
The standard adopted for determining who qualifies as a 'victim' for the purposes of seeking relief was broad in the case, with the Human Rights Committee and the Committee for the Elimination of Racial Discrimination disagreeing as to the exact scope of the standard. The standard established by the Human Rights Committee in 2003 has "also been adopted by the European Court of Human Rights."

== See also ==
- Det Mosaiske Trossamfund
