= Persatuan Belia Islam Nasional =

Islamic organization based in Selangor, Malaysia

Persatuan Belia Islam Nasional (PEMBINA)
- Founded: 2006
- Type: Islamic youth organisation NGO
- Headquarters: Bangi, Selangor
- Location: Malaysia
- Fields: Islamic youth activism
- Key people: Dr. Kamil Azmi Tohiran, Zaizul Azizi Zaman, Norzafry Norhalim
- Website: www.pembina.com.my

Persatuan Belia Islam Nasional (PEMBINA; In English for "National Islamic Youth Association") is a Malaysian Muslim youth organisation based in Kajang with branches in 30 states and 89 campus in Malaysia. PEMBINA was founded in 2006 and is registered under the Registrar Office Youth Societies under Malaysia Ministry of Youth & Sports. PEMBINA serves as the student society of Ikatan Muslimin Malaysia, with the intention to provide a working platform for its youth members to enhance youth empowerment and activism.

The majority of PEMBINA members are youths and students from local universities, abiding by the Malaysian University and University College Act (AUKU) which allows tertiary students to be members of legal NGOs. PEMBINA has grown into the fourth-largest Muslim youth organisation in Malaysia.

In 2019, PEMBINA organizes the HIMMAH program that attended by almost 1000 youth and university students. The objectives of the program to highlight are the new model of student movement by the focus on the five main agenda which is Muslim identity, Intellectualism, Volunteerism, Graduate Employability and Student Survival.

== Previous major events ==
- Entrepreneurship and financial management seminar
- Muslim Family Convention
- Himpunan Mahasiswa (HIMMAH)
- Festival Beliawanis Nasional (FBN)
- Anak Muda Bersama Warga Emas (Ageing Society Activities)
