= 212 Mart =

Indonesian sharia-oriented convenience stores

- Type: Cooperative
- Industry: Convenience stores
- Founded: January 6, 2017; 9 years ago
- Headquarters: Bogor, West Java, Indonesia
- Owner: 212 Sharia Cooperative
- Website: koperasisyariah212.co.id/212mart/

212 Mart is a brand of Indonesian sharia-oriented convenience stores formed by the 212 Sharia Cooperative (Koperasi Syariah 212) and inspired by the 212 Movement. According to its official website, the group was founded on January 6, 2017 by influential Islamic figures in Indonesia such as 13th Vice President Ma'ruf Amin, Ustad Bachtiar Nasir, and Didin Hafhiduddin. It is registered on the Ministry of Cooperatives.

212 Mart opened its first booth in Bogor, West Java. It later expanded to most of Indonesia and as of 2018 had more than 120 booths across the nation. The group's business principle consists of empowering small to medium enterprises owned by ordinary Indonesians and adhering to Sharia. As such, the group aims not to sell tobacco, condoms, or other haram products. During adhan prayers, 212 Mart closes their booths for 15 minutes. As of 2020, some 212 Mart branches have permanently closed.

== Controversy ==
In 2018, controversy arose when a link shared on WhatsApp encouraging people to invest in 212 Mart resulted in the fundraising of 2 billion Indonesian rupiahs.

In October 2020, employees working in stores in city of Samarinda complained that they did not receive their salary. Branch administrators disappeared and could not be contacted. 212 Mart stores in the city were closed without information, leading to investors reporting it to the police. As of May 2021, the case was still being investigated. The local police stated that the Samarinda fraud case is not related to and distinct from the central 212 Mart branch.
