= February 2017 Jakarta protests =

Mass protest by Islamist group in Indonesia

February 2017 Jakarta protests refer to a series of mass protest led by Islamist movements which took place on 11 February 2017 and 21 February 2017 in Jakarta, Indonesia, and dubbed as the Action 112 and the Action 212 respectively. The protests were aimed against the incumbent governor of Jakarta Special Capital Region Basuki Tjahaja Purnama (popularly known as "Ahok") for an alleged blasphemy of the Quran, the Islamic holy book.

== Background ==
The incumbent governor of Jakarta Basuki Tjahaja Purnama, who was contesting for the forthcoming 2017 Jakarta gubernatorial election, was accused of blasphemy against Islam following his speech on September 27, 2016. National outcry against his perceived misdemeanor had triggered nationwide protests in November 2016 and December 2016, the later culminated in the President of Indonesia Joko Widodo joining the Friday prayer alongside the Islamist leaders such as Muhammad Rizieq Shihab in order to mitigate the heightened tensions. The oppositions and Islamist groups, however, were not satisfied with the outcome of the previous protests and kept demanding for the jailing of Basuki for the blasphemy charge.

== Action 112 ==
The Action 112, also known as the 4th Islamic Defense Action, is a nonviolent protest succeeding the previous operations of Islamic Defense Action. The protest was coordinated by the Islamic Ummah Forum (FUI) and the National Movement of Fatwa Guards - Majelis Ulama Indonesia (GNPF-MUI). Initially, the action 112 was planned to be held at Monas Square, in the form of a long march on the streets. However, after the meeting of Muhammad Rizieq Shihab, the chairman of the Islamic Defenders Front (FPI), Wiranto who served the Coordinating Minister for Political, Legal, and Security Affairs, and the leaders of the GNPF-MUI, the form of the protest was changed to dhikr (recitation of short religious phrases or prayers) and tausiyah (broadcasting of dawah, the religious proselytizing) at the Istiqlal Mosque. Participants started arriving at the location since Friday night, and the activity started after the tahajjud prayer at 2.00 am. They prayed Fajr and Duha together during which they continued dhikr and tausiyah activities, in which national religious scholars were involved. It was ended after practicing the Zuhr prayers in congregation. Participants numbered more than 200,000 worshipers, and the Istiqlal Mosque was filled upon the mosque's yard.

Many rumors regarding the possible cancellation of the Action 112 were circulated by the mass media before the initiation. However, on February 9, FUI made a press release about the activities of the protest which included the announcement of the changes in the form of the protest, to "Dzikir & National Tausiyah for the Application of Al-Maidah Letter 51: Must Choose Muslim Leaders & Haram Choosing the Pagan Leader". This sent the message of planned commencement, and FUI has doubled down on its legality.

== Action 212 ==
The Action 212 was a protest succeeding the Action 112, held nearby the People's Representative Council building in Senayan, Central Jakarta. The action was initiated by FUI and was attended by the FPI leader Muhammad Rizieq Shihab, beginning at 08:00 am during the rain. Responding to the action, the two largest Islamic mass organizations in Indonesia, Nahdlatul Ulama and Muhammadiyah chose not to be involved considering its political implications. Several demands were submitted by the protesters during the action, requesting the People's Representative Council for sending a letter to the President Joko Widodo demanding the termination of Basuki's office and reaffirming that the gubernatorial post has to be considered unfit to be held by someone with defendant status in case of alleged blasphemy. They also requested law enforcement officers not to criminalize the ulama and students and requested law enforcement officers to arrest Ahok. The Commission III of the People's Representative Council forwarded these demands to the House leadership which to be forwarded to the President and reported to Chief of Police, General Tito Karnavian at a meeting with Commission III on February 22, 2017.

== See also ==
- 2016–17 Jakarta protests
