= 2016–17 Jakarta protests =

Islamist protests against Governor of Jakarta Basuki Tjahaja Purnama

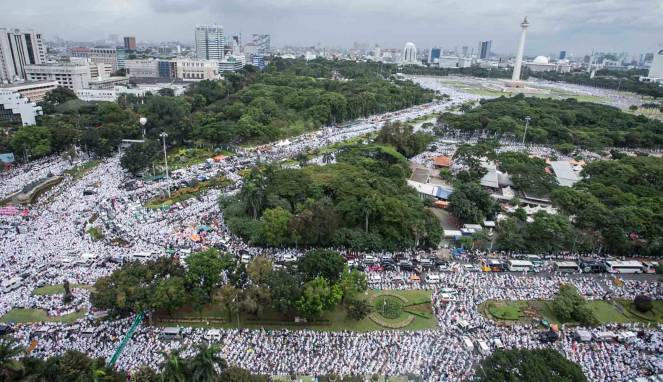
Aerial view of the protest on December 2, 2016.

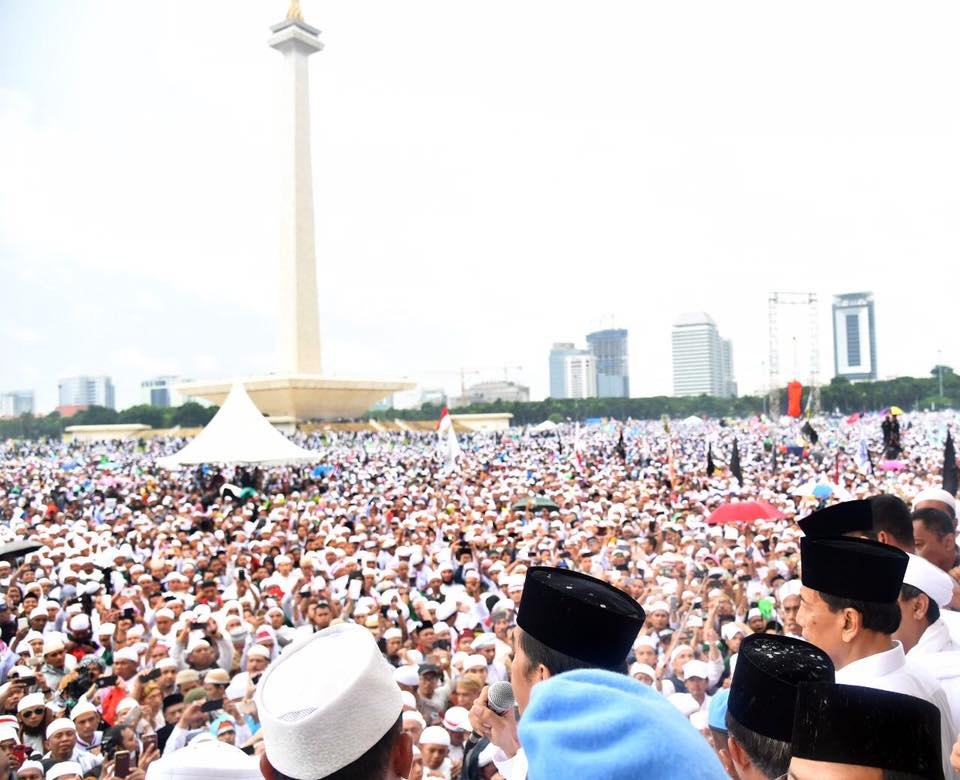
President of Indonesia Joko Widodo addressing protesters at the December 2016 rally.

The 2016–17 Jakarta protests, branded Aksi Bela Islam (Defend Islam Action) by the protesters, are series of Islamist protests against Governor of Jakarta Basuki Tjahaja Purnama, who was accused of committing blasphemy of the Quran. The protests were carried out by the Islamic Defenders Front alongside its Islamist collaborators which make up a single coalition called the 212 Movement, named after their third protest, held on 2 December 2016. The event marks the rising trend of Islamism and Islamic fundamentalism within the Indonesian Muslim society, with many Islamist groups, social media communities, and political parties having emerged following the protests.

A total of five protests were held, all close to the 2017 Jakarta gubernatorial election:

- October 2016 Jakarta protests on 14 October
- November 2016 Jakarta protests on 4 November
- December 2016 Jakarta protests on 2 December
- February 2017 Jakarta protests on 11 and 21 February
- March 2017 Jakarta protests on 31 March
