= 212th Division =

212th Division or 212th Infantry Division may refer to:

- 212th Division (People's Republic of China)
- 212th Infantry Division (Wehrmacht), Germany
- 212th Coastal Division, Italy
- 212th Division (Imperial Japanese Army)
- 212th Rifle Division, Soviet Union

== See also ==
- List of military divisions by number
- 212th Brigade (disambiguation)
- 212th (disambiguation)
