= International Convention on the Elimination of All Forms of Racial Discrimination =

1969 United Nations human rights instrument

ICERD
International Convention on the Elimination of All Forms of Racial Discrimination
- Location: New York
- Effective: 4 January 1969
- Condition: 27 ratifications
- Signatories: 88
- Parties: 182
- Depositary: UN Secretary-General
- Languages: Chinese, English, French, Russian and Spanish

Membership of the Convention on the Elimination of All Forms of Racial Discrimination: Recognise competence under Article 14 Do not recognise competence under Article 14 Signed but not ratified Neither signed nor ratified

The International Convention on the Elimination of All Forms of Racial Discrimination (ICERD) is a United Nations convention. A third-generation human rights instrument, the Convention commits its members to the elimination of racial discrimination and the promotion of understanding among all races. The convention also requires its parties to criminalize hate speech and criminalize membership in racist organizations.

The convention also includes an individual complaints mechanism, effectively making it enforceable against its parties. This has led to the development of a limited jurisprudence on the interpretation and implementation of the convention.

The convention was adopted and opened for signature by the United Nations General Assembly on 21 December 1965, and entered into force on 4 January 1969. As of July 2020, it has 88 countries as signatories and 182 countries as parties (including accessions and successions).

The convention is monitored by the Committee on the Elimination of Racial Discrimination (CERD).

== Genesis ==
In December 1960, following incidents of antisemitism in several parts of the world, the United Nations General Assembly adopted a resolution condemning "all manifestations and practices of racial, religious and national hatred" as violations of the United Nations Charter and Universal Declaration of Human Rights and calling on the governments of all states to "take all necessary measures to prevent all manifestations of racial, religious and national hatred". The Economic and Social Council followed this up by drafting a resolution on "manifestations of racial prejudice and national and religious intolerance", calling on governments to educate the public against intolerance and rescind discriminatory laws. Lack of time prevented this from being considered by the General Assembly in 1961, but it was passed the next year.

During the early debate on this resolution, African nations led by the Central African Republic, Chad, Dahomey, Guinea, Côte d'Ivoire, Mali, Mauritania, and Upper Volta pushed for more concrete action on the issue, in the form of an international convention against racial discrimination. Some nations preferred a declaration rather than a binding convention, while others wanted to deal with racial and religious intolerance in a single instrument. The eventual compromise, forced by the Arab nations' political opposition to treating religious intolerance at the same time as racial intolerance plus other nations' opinion that religious intolerance was less urgent, was for two resolutions, one calling for a declaration and draft convention aimed at eliminating racial discrimination, the other doing the same for religious intolerance.

Article 4, criminalizing incitement to racial discrimination, was also controversial in the drafting stage. In the first debate of the article, there were two drafts, one presented by the United States and one by the Soviet Union and Poland. The United States, supported by the United Kingdom, proposed that only incitement "resulting in or likely to result in violence" should be prohibited, whereas the Soviet Union wanted to "prohibit and disband racist, fascist and any other organization practicing or inciting racial discrimination". The Nordic countries proposed a compromise in which a clause of "due regard" to the rights Universal Declaration of Human Rights was added to be taken into account when crimininalizing hate speech.

The draft Declaration on the Elimination of All Forms of Racial Discrimination was adopted by the General Assembly on 20 November 1963. The same day the General Assembly called for the Economic and Social Council and the Commission on Human Rights to make the drafting of a Convention on the subject an absolute priority. The draft was completed by mid-1964, but delays in the General Assembly meant that it could not be adopted that year. It was finally adopted on 21 December 1965.

== Core provisions ==
=== Definition of "racial discrimination" ===
Preamble of the Convention reaffirms dignity and equality before the law citing Charter of United Nations and Universal Declaration of Human Rights and condemns colonialism citing Declaration on the Granting of Independence to Colonial Countries and Peoples, Declaration on the Elimination of All Forms of Racial Discrimination and also cites ILO Convention on Employment and Occupation (C111) and Convention against Discrimination in Education against discrimination.

Article 1 of the Convention defines "racial discrimination" as:

... any distinction, exclusion, restriction or preference based on race, colour, descent, or national or ethnic origin which has the purpose or effect of nullifying or impairing the recognition, enjoyment or exercise, on an equal footing, of human rights and fundamental freedoms in the political, economic, social, cultural or any other field of public life.

Distinctions made on the basis of citizenship (that is, between citizens and non-citizens) are specifically excluded from the definition, as are positive discrimination policies and other measures taken to redress imbalances and promote equity.

This definition does not distinguish between discrimination based on ethnicity and discrimination based on race, despite the following statement by anthropologists in the United Nations Economic and Social Council.

6. National, religious, geographic, linguistic and cultural groups do not necessarily coincide with racial groups; and the cultural traits of such groups have no demonstrated genetic connection with racial traits.

The clear conclusion in the report is that race and ethnicity can be correlated, but must not get mixed up. The inclusion of descent specifically covers discrimination on the basis of caste and other forms of inherited status. Discrimination need not be strictly based on race or ethnicity for the convention to apply. Rather, whether a particular action or policy discriminates is judged by its effects.

In seeking to determine whether an action has an effect contrary to the Convention, it will look to see whether that action has an unjustifiable disparate impact upon a group distinguished by race, colour, descent, or national or ethnic origin.

The question of whether an individual belongs to a particular racial group is to be decided, in the absence of justification to the contrary, by self-identification.

=== Prevention of discrimination ===
Article 1 of the Convention does not prohibit discrimination based on nationality, citizenship or naturalization but prohibits discrimination "against any particular nationality".

Article 2 of the Convention condemns racial discrimination and obliges parties to "undertake to pursue by all appropriate means and without delay a policy of eliminating racial discrimination in all its forms". It also obliges parties to promote understanding among all races. To achieve this, the Convention requires that signatories:

- Not practice racial discrimination in public institutions
- Not "sponsor, defend, or support" racial discrimination
- Review existing policies, and amend or revoke those that cause or perpetuate racial discrimination
- Prohibit "by all appropriate means, including legislation," racial discrimination by individuals and organisations within their jurisdictions
- Encourage groups, movements, and other means that eliminate barriers between races, and discourage racial division

Parties are obliged "when the circumstances so warrant" to use positive discrimination policies for specific racial groups to guarantee "the full and equal enjoyment of human rights and fundamental freedoms". However, these measures must be finite, and "shall in no case entail as a consequence the maintenance of unequal or separate rights for different racial groups after the objectives for which they were taken have been achieved".

Article 5 expands upon the general obligation of Article 2 and creates a specific obligation to guarantee the right of everyone to equality before the law regardless of "race, colour, or national or ethnic origin". It further lists specific rights this equality must apply to: equal treatment by courts and tribunals, security of the person and freedom from violence, the civil and political rights affirmed in the ICCPR, the economic, social and cultural rights affirmed in the ICESCR, and the right of access to any place or service used by the general public, "such as transport hotels, restaurants, cafes, theatres and parks." This list is not exhaustive, and the obligation extends to all human rights.

Article 6 obliges parties to provide "effective protection and remedies" through the courts or other institutions for any act of racial discrimination. This includes a right to a legal remedy and damages for injury suffered due to discrimination.

=== Condemnation of apartheid ===
Article 3 condemns apartheid and racial segregation and obliges parties to "prevent, prohibit and eradicate" these practices in territories under their jurisdiction. This article has since been strengthened by the recognition of apartheid as a crime against humanity in the Rome Statute of the International Criminal Court.

The Committee on the Elimination of Racial Discrimination regards this article as also entailing an obligation to eradicate the consequences of past policies of segregation, and to prevent racial segregation arising from the actions of private individuals.

=== Prohibition of incitement ===
Article 4 of the Convention condemns propaganda and organizations that attempt to justify discrimination or are based on the idea of racial supremacism. It obliges parties, "with due regard to the principles embodied in the Universal Declaration of Human Rights", to adopt "immediate and positive measures" to eradicate these forms of incitement and discrimination. Specifically, it obliges parties to criminalize hate speech, hate crimes and the financing of racist activities, and to prohibit and criminalize membership in organizations that "promote and incite" racial discrimination. A number of parties have reservations on this article, and interpret it as not permitting or requiring measures that infringe on the freedoms of speech, association or assembly.

The Committee on the Elimination of Racial Discrimination regards this article as a mandatory obligation of parties to the convention, and has repeatedly criticized parties for failing to abide by it. It regards the obligation as consistent with the freedoms of opinion and expression affirmed in the UNDHR and ICCPR and notes that the latter specifically outlaws inciting racial discrimination, hatred and violence. It views the provisions as necessary to prevent organised racial violence and the "political exploitation of ethnic difference."

=== Promotion of tolerance ===
Article 7 obliges parties to adopt "immediate and effective measures", particularly in education, to combat racial prejudice and encourage understanding and tolerance between different racial, ethnic and national groups.

=== Dispute resolution mechanism ===
Articles 11 through 13 of the Convention establish a dispute resolution mechanism between parties. A party that believes another party is not implementing the Convention may complain to the Committee on the Elimination of Racial Discrimination. The committee will pass on the complaint, and if it is not resolved between the two parties, may establish an ad hoc Conciliation Commission to investigate and make recommendations on the matter. This procedure has been first invoked in 2018, by Qatar against Saudi Arabia and UAE and by Palestine against Israel.

Article 22 further allows any dispute over the interpretation or application of the convention to be referred to the International Court of Justice. This clause has been invoked three times, by Georgia against Russia, by Ukraine against Russia, by Qatar against UAE.

=== Individual complaints mechanism ===
Article 14 of the Convention establishes an individual complaints mechanism similar to that of the First Optional Protocol to the International Covenant on Civil and Political Rights, Optional Protocol to the Convention on the Rights of Persons with Disabilities and Optional Protocol to the Convention on the Elimination of All Forms of Discrimination against Women. Parties may at any time recognise the competence of the Committee on the Elimination of Racial Discrimination to consider complaints from individuals or groups who claim their rights under the Convention have been violated. Such parties may establish local bodies to hear complaints before they are passed on. Complainants must have exhausted all domestic remedies, and anonymous complaints and complaints that refer to events that occurred before the country concerned joined Convention are not permitted. The committee can request information from and make recommendations to a party.

The individual complaints mechanism came into operation in 1982, after it had been accepted by ten states-parties. As of 2010, 58 states had recognised the competence of the committee, and 54 cases have been dealt with by the committee.

== Reservations ==
A number of parties have made reservations and interpretative declarations to their application of the convention. The Convention text forbids reservations "incompatible with the object and purpose of this Convention" or that would inhibit the operation of any body established by it. A reservation is considered incompatible or inhibitive if two-thirds of parties object to it.

Article 22

Afghanistan, Bahrain, China, Cuba, Egypt, Equatorial Guinea, India, Indonesia, Iraq, Israel, Kuwait, Lebanon, Libya, Madagascar, Morocco, Mozambique, Nepal, Saudi Arabia, Syria, Thailand, Turkey, Vietnam, and Yemen do not consider themselves bound by Article 22. Some interpret this article as allowing disputes to be referred to the International Court of Justice only with the consent of all involved parties.

Obligations beyond existing constitution

Antigua and Barbuda, the Bahamas, Barbados, Guyana, Jamaica, Nepal, Papua New Guinea, Thailand and United States interpret the convention as not implying any obligations beyond the limits of their existing constitutions.

Hate speech

Austria, Belgium, France, Ireland, Italy, Japan, Malta, Monaco, Switzerland and Tonga all interpret Article 4 as not permitting or requiring measures that threaten the freedoms of speech, opinion, association, and assembly. Antigua and Barbuda, the Bahamas, Barbados, Fiji, Nepal, Papua New Guinea, Thailand and United Kingdom interpret the convention as creating an obligation to enact measures against hate speech and hate crimes only when a need arises.

The United States of America "does not accept any obligation under this Convention, in particular under articles 4 and 7, to restrict those [extensive protections of individual freedom of speech, expression and association contained in the Constitution and laws of the United States], through the adoption of legislation or any other measures, to the extent that they are protected by the Constitution and laws of the United States."

Immigration

Monaco and Switzerland reserve the right to apply their own legal principles on the entry of foreigners into their labour markets. The United Kingdom does not regard the Commonwealth Immigrants Act 1962 and Commonwealth Immigrants Act 1968 as constituting any form of racial discrimination.

Indigenous people

Tonga reserves the right not to apply the convention to any restriction on the alienation of land held by indigenous Tongans. Fiji has significant reservations around Article 5, and reserves the right not to implement those provisions if they are incompatible with existing law on voting rights, the alienation of land by indigenous Fijians.

== Jurisprudence ==
=== At the CERD ===
The individual complaints mechanism has led to a limited jurisprudence on the interpretation and implementation of the convention. As at September 2011, 48 complaints have been registered with the committee; 17 of these have been deemed inadmissible, 16 have led to a finding of no violation, and in 11 cases a party has been found to have violated the convention. Three cases were still pending.

Several cases have dealt with the treatment of Romani people in Eastern Europe. In Koptova v. Slovakia the Committee found that resolutions by several villages in Slovakia forbidding the residence of Roma were discriminatory and restricted freedom of movement and residence, and recommended the Slovak government take steps to end such practices. In L.R. v. Slovakia the Committee found that the Slovak government had failed to provide an effective remedy for discrimination suffered by Roma after the cancellation of a housing project on ethnic grounds. In Durmic v. Serbia and Montenegro the Committee found a systemic failure by the Serbian government to investigate and prosecute discrimination against Roma in access to public places.

In several cases, notably L.K. v. Netherlands and Gelle v. Denmark, the committee has criticized parties for their failure to adequately prosecute acts of racial discrimination or incitement. In both cases, the Committee refused to accept "any claim that the enactment of law making racial discrimination a criminal act in itself represents full compliance with the obligations of States parties under the Convention". Such laws "must also be effectively implemented by the competent national tribunals and other State institutions". While the Committee accepts the discretion of prosecutors on whether or not to lay charges, this discretion "should be applied in each case of alleged racial discrimination in the light of the guarantees laid down in the Convention"

In The Jewish community of Oslo et al. v. Norway, the Committee found that the prohibition of hate speech was compatible with freedom of speech, and that the acquittal of a neo-Nazi leader by the Supreme Court of Norway on freedom of speech grounds was a violation of the convention.

In Hagan v. Australia, the Committee ruled that, while not originally intended to demean anyone, the name of the "E. S. 'Nigger' Brown Stand" (named in honour of 1920s rugby league player Edward Stanley Brown) at a Toowoomba sports field was racially offensive and should be removed.

=== At the ICJ ===
Georgia won a judgment for a provisional measure of protection at the ICJ over the Russian Federation in the case of Russo-Georgian War.

== Impact ==
The impact of an international treaty can be measured in two ways: by its acceptance, and by its implementation. On the first measure, the convention has gained near-universal acceptance by the international community, with fewer than twenty (mostly small) states yet to become parties. Most major states have also accepted the convention's individual complaints mechanism, signaling a strong desire to be bound by the convention's provisions. The convention has faced persistent problems with reporting since its inception, with parties frequently failing to report fully, or even at all. As of 2008, twenty parties had failed to report for more than ten years, and thirty parties had failed to report for more than five. One party, Sierra Leone, had failed to report since 1976, while two more – Liberia and Saint Lucia had never met their reporting requirements under the convention. The committee has responded to this persistent failure to report by reviewing the late parties anyway – a strategy that has produced some success in gaining compliance with reporting requirements. This lack of reporting is seen by some as a significant failure of the convention. However the reporting system has also been praised as providing "a permanent stimulus inducing individual States to enact anti-racist legislation or amend the existing one when necessary."

== Committee on the Elimination of Racial Discrimination ==
The Committee on the Elimination of Racial Discrimination is a body of human rights experts tasked with monitoring the implementation of the convention. It consists of 18 independent human rights experts, elected for four-year terms, with half the members elected every two years. Members are elected by secret ballot of the parties, with each party allowed to nominate one of its nationals to the committee.

All parties are required to submit regular reports to the Committee outlining the legislative, judicial, policy and other measures they have taken to give effect to the convention. The first report is due within a year of the Convention entering into effect for that state; thereafter reports are due every two years or whenever the Committee requests. The Committee examines each report and addresses its concerns and recommendations to the state party in the form of "concluding observations".

On 10 August 2018, United Nations human rights experts expressed alarm over many credible reports that China had detained a million or more ethnic Uyghurs in Xinjiang. Gay McDougall, a member of the committee, said that "In the name of combating religious extremism, China had turned Xinjiang into something resembling a massive internment camp, shrouded in secrecy, a sort of no-rights zone."

On 13 August 2019, the Committee considered the first report submitted by the Palestinian Authority. A number of experts questioned the delegation regarding antisemitism, particularly in textbooks. Silvio José Albuquerque e Silva (Brazil) also raised evidence of discrimination against Roma and other minorities, the status of women, and oppression of the LGBT community. The committee's report of 30 August 2019 reflected these concerns. On 23 April 2018 Palestine filed an inter-state complaint against Israel for breaches of its obligations under the International Convention on the Elimination of All Forms of Racial Discrimination (ICERD).

On 4 and 5 December 2019, the Committee considered the report submitted by Israel and in its conclusions of 12 December noted that it is worried about "existing discriminatory legislation, the segregation of Israeli society into Jewish and non-Jewish sectors" and other complaints. The Committee also decided that it has jurisdiction regarding the inter-State communication submitted by the State of Palestine on 23 April 2018 against the State of Israel. Israel's Ministry of Foreign Affairs responded by alleging bias by the committee members, noting that their "blatant anti-Israel posture, and reckless disregard for the welfare of Israelis, is a shocking neglect of the duties of the CERD Committee to act with impartiality and objectivity."

On 31 August to 1 September 2026, the Committee called for inquiries and commissions into reparations for slavery.

The Committee typically meets every March and August in Geneva. The current (as of February 2024) membership of the committee is:

Name of Member	Nationality	Term expires
Mr. Noureddin Amir	Algeria	2026
Mr. Michal Balcerzak (Vice-chairperson)	Poland	2026
Mr. Michael Boker-Wilson	Liberia	2028
Ms. Chinsung Chung (Vice-chairperson)	South Korea	2026
Mr. Bakari Sidiki Diaby	Côte d’Ivoire	2026
Ms. Régine Esseneme	Cameroon	2026
Mr. Jian Guan	China	2028
Mr. Ibrahima Guisse (Rapporteur)	Senegal	2028
Mr. Chrispine Gwalawala Sibande	Malawi	2028
Mr. Gün Kut	Turkey	2026
Ms. Gay McDougall	United States of America	2026
Mr. Vadili Rayess	Mauritania	2028
Ms. Verene Albertha Shepherd (chairperson)	Jamaica	2028
Ms. Stamatia Stavrinaki (Vice-chairperson)	Greece	2028
Ms. Mazalo Tebie	Togo	2026
Ms. Faith Dikeledi Pansy Tlakula	South Africa	2028
Ms. Pela Boker Wilson	Liberia	2028
Mr. Abderrahman Tlemcani	Morocco	2028
Mr. Yeung Kam John Yeung Sik Yuen	Mauritius	2026

== Opposition ==
=== In Malaysia ===
On 8 December 2018, two of Malaysia's major right wing then-opposition political parties – the Islamist Malaysian Islamic Party (PAS) and the ethnonationalist United Malays National Organisation (UMNO) – organised an "Anti-ICERD Peaceful Rally" with the support of several non-government organizations on fears of the convention allegedly compromising bumiputera privileges and special positions of the Malay people and Islam in the country, a major tenet held by both these parties. This rally was held in the capital city of the country, Kuala Lumpur.

== See also ==
- Anti-ICERD Rally in Kuala Lumpur Malaysia
- Anti-racism
- Declaration on the Elimination of All Forms of Racial Discrimination
- Discrimination based on nationality
- Environmental racism
- Environmental racism in Europe
- Racial Equality Proposal, 1919
- World Conference against Racism
