= Sheikh Ali Jaber =

Indonesian preacher (1976–2021)

Sheikh Ali Jaber علي صالح محمد علي جابر
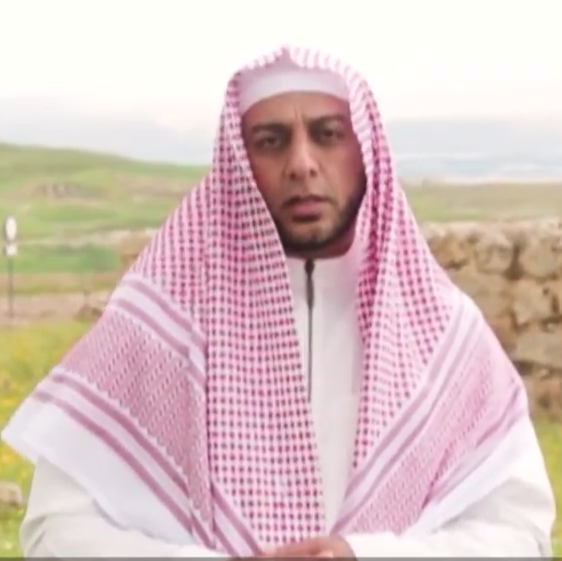

Background information
- Born: Ali Saleh Mohammed Ali Jaber; 3 February 1976; Medina, Saudi Arabia
- Died: 14 January 2021 (aged 44) Jakarta, Indonesia
- Genres: Islamic, Nasheed, Hamd, Na'at
- Occupations: Qari, imam, Habib, Da'i
- Instrument: Vocals
- Years active: 2008–2021

Ali Saleh Mohammed Ali Jaber (Arabic: علي صالح محمد علي جابر, romanized: ʿAlī Ṣāliḥ Muḥammad ʿAlī Ǧābir) or better known as Sheikh Ali Jaber (3 February 1976 – 14 January 2021) was a Saudi Arabian-born preacher and scholar with Indonesian nationality. He has also been a judge on Hafiz Indonesia and has proselytised for Islam on television.

== Personal life ==
Ali Jaber has been devoted to reading the Qur'an since childhood. It was his father who initially motivated Ali Jaber to study the Qur'an.

Although at first what he lived was the wish of his father, over time he realized it was his own need and by the age of eleven, he had memorized 30 juz of the Qur'an.

Sheikh Ali Jaber began memorizing the Quran at a young age and later pursued formal Islamic education in Saudi Arabia. He studied under some of the most prominent scholars of the time and obtained a degree in Shariah Law from the Islamic University of Madinah.

After finishing his studies, Sheikh Ali Jaber became an Islamic scholar, preacher, and Quran reciter. He gave talks and lectures in different mosques and Islamic centers in many countries. People liked his speeches because they were easy to understand and related to problems faced by people today. He also wrote many books on Islamic subjects.

== Stabbing ==
On 13 September 2020, Syekh Ali Jaber was stabbed by an unknown person while lecturing at the Falahuddin Mosque, Sukajawa, Bandar Lampung. As a result, he suffered a stab wound to the right arm. The suspect, who was born on 1 April 1996, Alfin Andrian, was successfully secured.

== Death ==
Sheikh Ali Jaber died on 14 January 2021, at age 44 from post-COVID-19 complications at YARSI Hospital, Cempaka Putih, Jakarta.

== Filmography ==
=== Television ===
- Nikmatnya Sedekah
- Cahaya dari Madinah
- Kurma (kuliah ramadhan)
- Hafiz Indonesia
- Damai Indonesiaku
- Kultum Bersama Syekh Ali Jaber

=== Film ===
- Surga Menanti
