= Declaration on the Elimination of All Forms of Racial Discrimination =

Declaration adopted in 1963 by the United Nations General Assembly

The Declaration on the Elimination of All Forms of Racial Discrimination is a human rights proclamation issued by the United Nations General Assembly, outlining the body's views on racism. It was adopted by the General Assembly on 20 November 1963. The Declaration was an important precursor to the legally binding Convention on the Elimination of All Forms of Racial Discrimination.

== Summary ==
The Declaration follows the structure of the Universal Declaration of Human Rights, with a preamble followed by eleven articles.

Article 1 declares that discrimination on the basis of race, colour or ethnicity is "an offence to human dignity" and condemns it as a violation of the principles underlying the United Nations Charter, a violation of human rights and a threat to peace and security.

Article 2 calls on states, institutions, groups and individuals not to discriminate on the basis of race in human rights. It calls on states to end support for discrimination, and to take affirmative action where necessary to correct it.

Article 3 calls for particular efforts to end racial discrimination in civil rights, housing, employment, education, and calls for everyone to have free access to public places and services regardless of race.

Article 4 calls on states to review policies and repeal laws which discriminate on the basis of race.

Article 5 calls for an end to racial segregation and apartheid.

Article 6 calls for an end to racial discrimination in political rights, in particular the right to vote and stand for public office.

Article 7 declares that everyone has the right to equality before the law and to equal justice before the law regardless of race. It calls for everyone to have an effective remedy, enforceable through the courts, for harm suffered through racial discrimination.

Article 8 calls for education to promote tolerance and racial understanding.

Article 9 condemns propaganda and organisations based on the idea of racial supremacism. It calls for incitements to racial violence, or hate speech to be criminalised, and for racist organisations to be outlawed.

Article 10 calls on the United Nations to study the causes of racial discrimination so as to better combat it.

Article 11 calls on every state to promote respect of fundamental human rights and the principles of this declaration and the Universal Declaration of Human Rights (UDHR).

As a declaration rather than a treaty, the document is non-binding.

== See also ==
- Convention on the Elimination of All Forms of Racial Discrimination
- International Day for the Elimination of Racial Discrimination
- Anti-racism
