= Malaysian Muslim Solidarity =

Malaysian Islamist non-governmental organization

Malaysian Muslim Solidarity Ikatan Muslimin Malaysia ايکتن مسلمين مليسيا جمعية الاتحاد الإسلامي الماليزي ISMA
- Abbreviation: ISMA
- Predecessor: Ikatan Siswazah Muslim Malaysia (changed in 2005)
- Formation: 1997
- Type: Non-profit, Non-government organisation (NGO)
- Purpose: Islam
- Region served: Malaysia
- President: Aminuddin Yahaya
- Website: www.isma.org.my
- Formerly called: Ikatan Siswazah Muslim Malaysia

Malaysian Muslim Solidarity (Malay: Ikatan Muslimin Malaysia, often known by its acronym ISMA) is a Malaysian ultra-conservative Islamist non-government organisation. It was established in 1997 with the name Ikatan Siswazah Muslim Malaysia, which was later changed to present Ikatan Muslimin Malaysia in 2005.

ISMA is a nativist organization that derides the idea of non-Malay participation in Malaysian politics as "overly compromising" and transgressive against the supposed special indigeneity of Malaysia's Malay population. It focuses on promotion of Muslim faith targeting Malay demographics with political intention to "develop and empower Islamic civilisation in Malaysia on the basis of mutual justice” based on their slogan Melayu Sepakat, Islam Berdaulat (Malays Unite for Islam Sovereignty); it is particularly known for its vocal opposition towards what it claims to be rampant "influences of liberalism, deviationism of the Shia denomination, and threats of Christianisation" in the country.

The NGO now has 35 branches nationwide and 9 international branches networked by alumni of British and Middle Eastern universities. It is also affiliated with the Pan-Malaysian Islamic Front political party where candidates have come from the organization. Persatuan Belia Islam Nasional or PEMBINA, is the student society of Ikatan Muslimin Malaysia.

== Affiliation ==
ISMA is a member of Allied Coordinating Committee of Islamic NGOs (ACCIN). ISMA was one of the organisers of HIMPUN (Himpunan Sejuta Umat) public rally at Shah Alam Stadium on 22 October 2011. ISMA is also a member of Gerakan Pembela Ummah (UMMAH) of which its current President Aminuddin Yahaya is the Chairman of UMMAH.

== Political involvement ==
ISMA has declared that they are not a political party and still a NGO while its members participated the 2013 general election (GE13). The ISMA members has contested the election as candidates under on the ticket of Pan-Malaysian Islamic Front (BERJASA) party. None of their contestants win in the election despite ISMA had claimed that the peoples has supported their motive for contesting the general election and political involvement. In the aftermath, some of the ISMA leaders has joined BERJASA to remain active in politics up to 2018 general election (GE14). Although ISMA has denied it, the obvious involvement has proven speculation and accusation the NGO is indirectly taking over the party to turn it into their new political platform with a rebranded new image in facing next general election (GE15) strategy.

It was a main organizer of the 2018 anti-ICERD rally also attended by right-wing parties.

== Controversies and issues ==
=== Opposition to attempts at the Universal Periodic Review of Malaysia ===
The organisation was a major player in opposing the Coalition of Malaysian Non-Governmental Organizations (COMANGO) in 2008. The collective's main goal was to involve in the Universal Periodic Review of the country at that time. The organization claims that the collective in its seeking of cooperation with the United Nations to "bring forth and spread a Western-based liberal agenda"; many of its meetings were organized to speak of its opposition of the movement to the Malaysian public. The organization also accused Marina Mahathir of cooperating with the collective due to her membership in the Sisters in Islam directing body, which results in Marina files suit against ISMA for defamation.

Marina has settled her libel suit against ISMA after its deputy president read out a statement expressing their regrets to her. There was no order as to costs.

=== Racial bigotry slurs ===
In 2014, ISMA president then, Ustaz Abdullah Zaik Abd Rahman had made a racial statement that "the Chinese immigrants who were brought into Malaya by British are intruders of the country" in its ISMAWeb portal, the NGO's mouthpiece. Political view of ISMA, just an NGO in the country has never been considered to represent the majority Malay in Malaysia as claimed by the controversial president.

Abdullah Zaik remains adamant and recalcitrant despite numerous police reports lodged against him and calls for him to be charged. In 2016, he was eventually charged under Sedition Act over his article, found guilty and sentenced with a mere RM2,000 fine or two years imprisonment.

=== Challenges to proclaim Islamic State in Malaysia ===
On 26 December 2018, the organization launched a petition which it believes as a path to promote and reaffirm goals of making Malaysia an "Islamic state", as evidential by said petition's slogan Malaysia Negara Islam ("Malaysia is an Islamic State"). The campaign sparked criticism and protest from significant groups including the moderate group of eminent ex-civil servants, G25 and military veterans association, Persatuan Patriot Kebangsaan (PATRIOT).

=== Links to Palestine charity fund and embezzlement ===
A few key figures in ISMA have ties to Aman Palestin, a non-governmental organization established in 2004 that collects money intended to aid victims of conflict in Palestine, Syria and Lebanon: former president Abdullah Zaik Abdul Rahman is its current executive director and ISMA's vice-president Zainur Rashid is Aman Palestine's adviser. On 23 November 2023, the Malaysian Anti-Corruption Commission conducted a raid on Aman Palestin's offices discovering assets totaling RM15,868,762.00 in 41 direct and indirect bank accounts and including four 1-kilogramme Grade 999.9 gold bars. On 15 February 2024, the Kuala Lumpur High Court charged Aman Palestin's executive chairman, CEO, and director with 164 charges of embezzlement relating to the misappropriation of donations totalling RM85 million (US$17 million).
