= Mamah Dedeh =

Indonesian preacher

- Born: 5 August 1951; Ciamis
- Alma mater: Syarif Hidayatullah State Islamic University Jakarta
- Occupation: Television presenter, preacher
- Children: 4

Dedeh Rosidah or better known as Mamah Dedeh (born 5 August 1951) is an Indonesian preacher and television celebrity and known as the host of a popular television series: Mama Dan Aa.

== Personal life ==
Mamah Dedeh was born in Ciamis as the daughter of Sujai and Syarifuddin. At the age of 17, she was sent to Jakarta by her father to study Islam at the Universitas Islam Negeri Syarif Hidayatullah Jakarta, despite her aspiration to become a painter. In 1994, the actor Benyamin Sueb asked her to do a radio program. It was at that time when she got the name "Mamah Dedeh" because she raised foster children. In 1970, she married Syarifuddin and has 4 children.

On 18 November 2020, Mamah Dedeh was tested positive for COVID-19.

== Mama Dan Aa ==
Mama Dan Aa is an Islamic televangelist TV-program which started airing in 2014. Mamah Dedeh has gained popularity by tackling issues in society with her frank and funny way. Her audience consists mostly of women wearing different colors in multiple sections. The women are engaged to ask questions by asking: "Mamah, can you solve my problem?". She addresses modern topics, such as social media, infidelity and sexual relation. It airs almost every day on Indosiar early in the morning.
