= 212th Division (People's Republic of China) =

212th Division (1949–51)
- Active: 1949.7 - 1951.12
- Country: People's Republic of China
- Branch: People's Liberation Army
- Type: Division
- Role: Infantry
- Part of: 51st Corps
- Engagements: Chinese Civil War

The 212th Division (Chinese: 第212师) was created in July 1949 under the Regulation of the Redesignations of All Organizations and Units of the Army, issued by Central Military Commission on November 1, 1948, basing on the 313th and 314th Division, 128th Corps, 19th Army Group (National Revolutionary Army) of Republic of China Army defected in May 1949.

The division was part of 51st Corps. Under the flag of 212th division it took part in the Chinese Civil War. The division except its 634th Regiment was disbanded in December 1951. In December 1952 the 634th Regiment was absorbed into the People's Volunteer Army.
