= 212 (missile) =

Soviet cruise missile

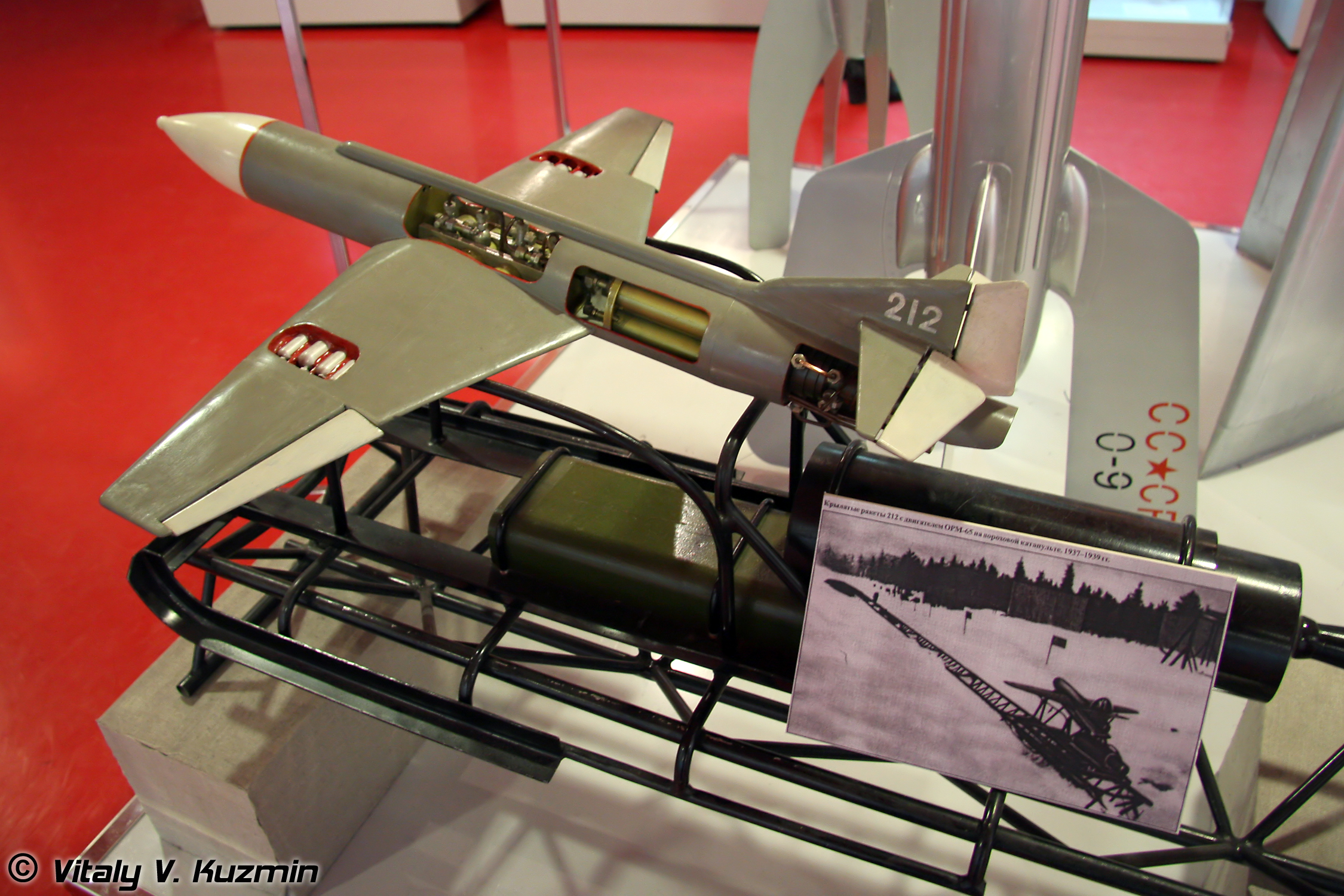
- Scale model of 212 missile in Memorial Museum of Cosmonautics, Moscow
- Type: Cruise
- Place of origin: Soviet Union

Production history
- Designed: August 2, 1936

Specifications
- Mass: 165 kilograms (364 lb)
- Length: 2.59 metres (102 in)
- Wingspan: 3.05 metres (120 in)
- Engine: ORM-65 rocket engine
- Launch platform: Catapult / Bomber

212 was Soviet experimental cruise missile developed in 1936 by Sergei Korolev. It was tested twice before being cancelled in 1939.

The design was completed on August 2, 1936, and consisted of a rocket with wings which launched from a catapult. The catapult was tested twice in November, 1936, using a mock-up of the missile; both tests failed. It was then decided to use a Tupolev TB-3 aircraft as launch platform. The first test was done on May 27, 1938. Korolev was arrested one month later, but the project continued without him. On January 10, 1938, it was decided to no longer use Valentin Glushko's ORM-65 rocket engine due to problems with the control system and some explosions. At that time the name of the missile was changed to 803. During 1939 there were two more tests, failing again due to the control system. The project was finally abandoned.
