= November 2016 Jakarta protests =

Religious protests in Indonesia

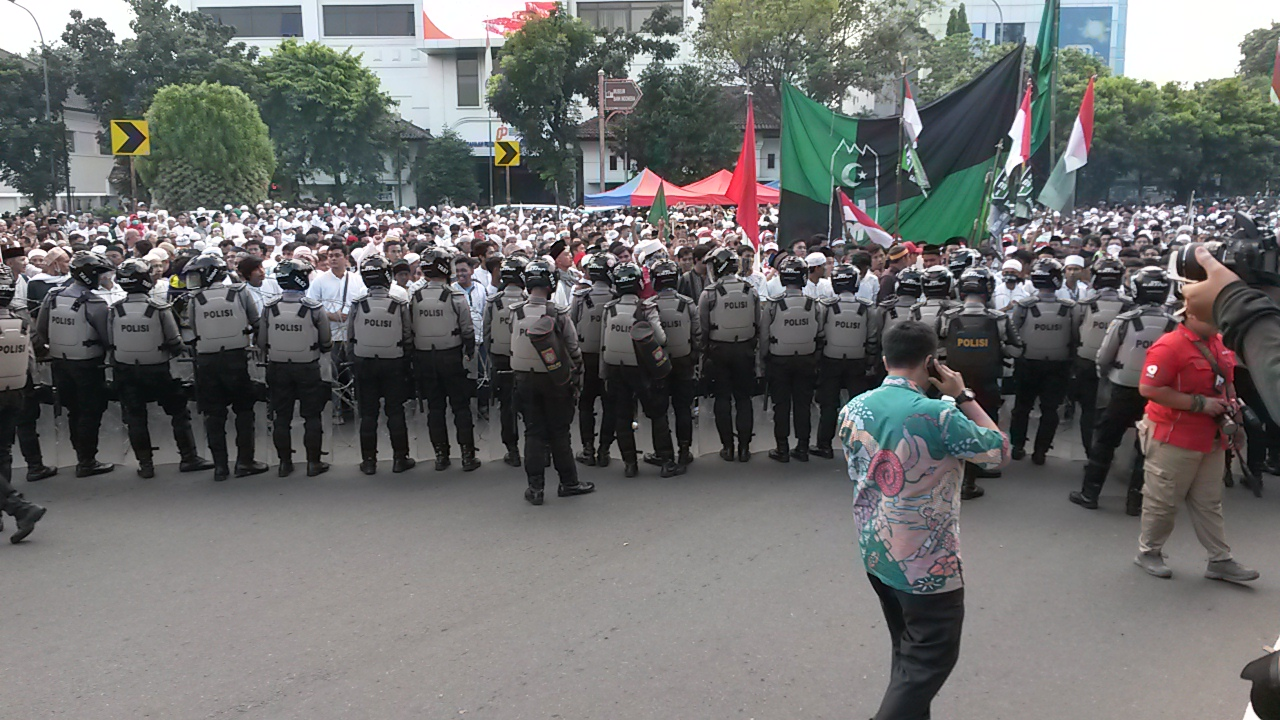
A group of Indonesian National Police officers (foreground) standing within the protest attendees (background). Several protesters can be seen waving Indonesian flags alongside the flags of their respective Islamist groups.

November 2016 Jakarta protests (also called Protests defending the Quran or 4 November protests) refer to an Islamist mass protest which took place on 4 November 2016 in Jakarta, Indonesia. It was attended by an estimated 50,000–200,000 protesters, and was aimed against the Governor of Jakarta Basuki Tjahaja Purnama (popularly known by his Chinese nickname "Ahok"), for alleged blasphemy of the Quran, the Islamic holy book. A counter-protest led by government officials and social activists in support of interfaith unity was led on 30 November.

== Background ==
Ahok became the Governor of Jakarta when as Vice-Governor, he took over from Joko Widodo, who was elected President of Indonesia in 2014. He is Jakarta's first ethnic Chinese governor, and the first non-Muslim in 50 years. His ethnicity and Christian faith make him a double-minority in Muslim-majority Indonesia. He sought to be elected in his own right in the 2017 gubernatorial election. Some Islamic groups opposed his campaign, citing a passage of the Quran, notably verse 51 of Sura al-Ma'idah, which they interpret as a prohibition on Muslims from electing a non-Muslim leader.

On 27 September 2016, in a speech in front of citizens of Thousand Islands, he noted that some citizens would not vote for him because they are being "deceived using Verse 51 of Al Maidah and other things," referring to a verse that some groups have cited as grounds to oppose him. The provincial government of Jakarta uploaded the video recording to YouTube in a channel which often features Ahok's activities. Citizens and pundits criticised Ahok's statement, considering it an insult to the Quran. Another video was uploaded by Buni Yani, who edited the video in a way that changed the meaning of Ahok's words. In the original video, Ahok says, "Ladies and gentlemen […] you have been deceived by the use of Al Maidah 51 [of the Quran]", while in the accompanying texts, Buni wrote, "Ladies and gentlemen [Muslim voters] have been deceived by Al Maidah 51."

The videos went viral, and Ahok was criticised in social media such as Facebook and Twitter. A Change.org petition criticising him gained tens of thousands of signatures. Several organisations, including the Islamic Defenders Front (FPI) and a local chapter of the Indonesian Ulema Council, reported Ahok to the police, accusing him of having violated Indonesia's Law On Misuse and Insult of Religion. Ahok apologised on 10 October, but the report was not withdrawn, and the police began working on the case.

Because Buni Yani's edited version of the video defamed Ahok, Buni was charged with inciting religious and ethnic hatred on social media under Article 28 of the Electronic Information and Transactions (ITE) Law, which carries a maximum sentence of six years in prison. Jakarta Police spokesperson Sr. Comr. Awi Setiyono commented, "We have found sufficient evidence to build a case and name him a suspect." Buni denied the charge, saying that he only deleted some of the footage before uploading it, though he conceded to making errors in transcribing the speech.

== Prelude to protest ==
In response to Ahok's speech and the alleged delays in the police case against him, several Islamic organisation, including the FPI lead's by Muhammad Rizieq Shihab, planned a mass protest. Indonesia's two biggest Islamic organisations Nahdlatul Ulama and Muhammadiyah did not encourage their members to attend the protest but did not go as far as prohibiting members from attending it. Flyers for the action called for attendees to be prepared for possibly staying overnight. Indonesian police deployed 7,000 personnel in anticipation of the protests. Security was also increased in Jakarta's Chinatown areas and Christian churches, amid rising concerns of a possible reoccurrence of "traumatic incidents".

On 3 November, the day before the protests, the Indonesian government blocked access to eleven websites affiliated with the planning of the protests, on the charge of spreading hate speech and extremist sentiments.

== Protest ==
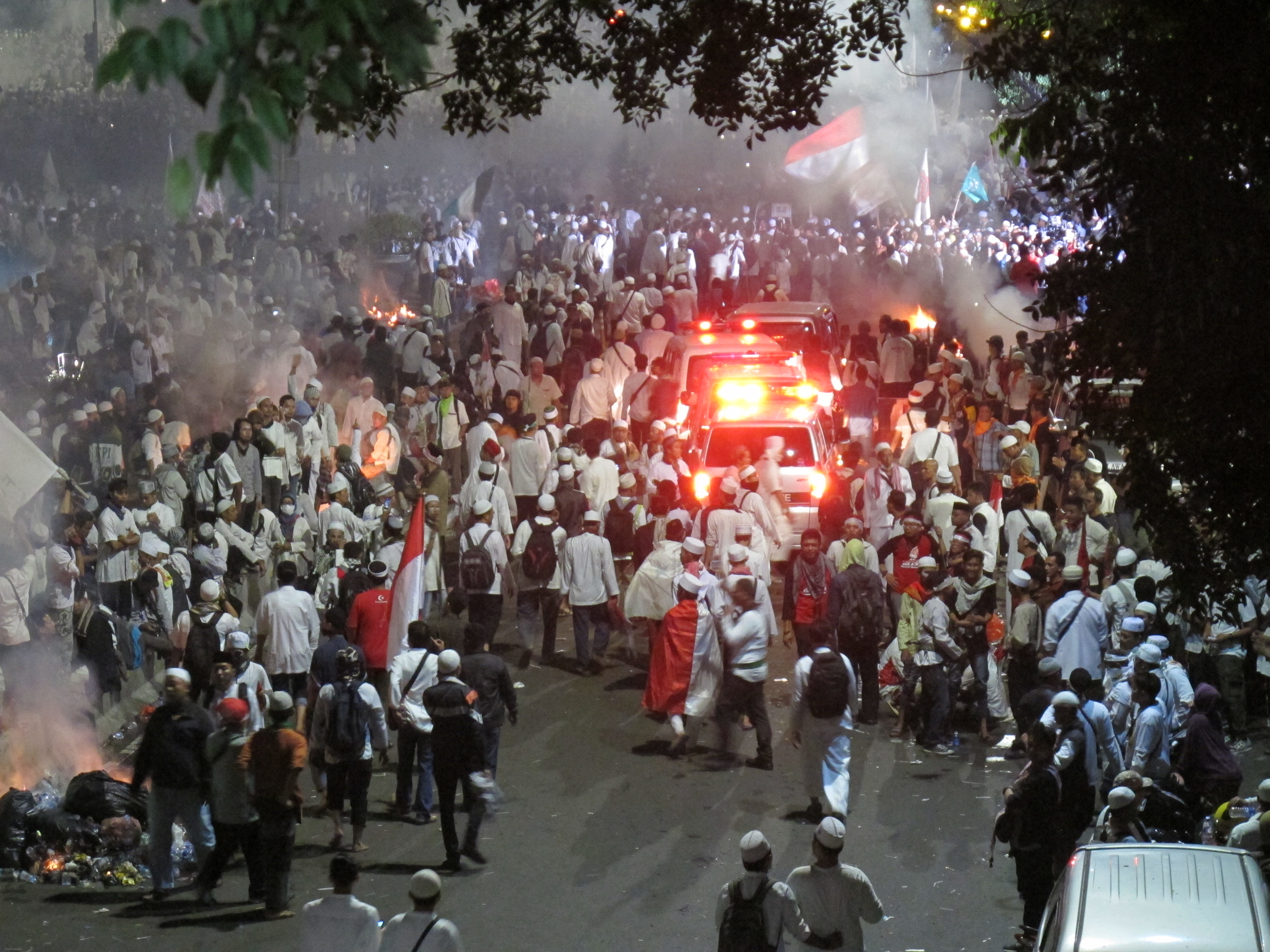
Protests against Ahok in Jakarta, 4 November 2016

The protests began around noon with a march from Istiqlal Mosque to the presidential palace. The march was mostly non-violent and organised. Estimates for the attendance ranged from 50,000 to 200,000. Former Parliament Speaker Amien Rais, Vice-Speakers of Parliament Fahri Hamzah and Fadli Zon, an Islamist leader Bachtiar Nasir, leader of FPI Muhammad Rizieq Shihab, as well as celebrities Ahmad Dhani and Rhoma Irama attended the protest. However, after nightfall, past the allotted time for the protest, groups of violent demonstrators provoked a riot and clashed with the police, setting fire to some vehicles. One elderly man died in the riots, and at least 160 protesters and 79 police officers were injured. The location of the protest began to calm down around 21:00 local time.

== Aftermath ==
Vice President Jusuf Kalla, who met representatives of the protest, promised that the investigation would be completed within two weeks. At midnight 5 November, President Joko Widodo held a press conference on the protests and reiterated his commitment to legal action against Ahok.

On 2 December, another rally was held in Central Jakarta, which was attended by estimated 200,000-500,000 people. The rally begins with a non-violent protest around Central Jakarta and culminating in a massive Friday congregational prayer in the Merdeka Square, surrounding the National Monument.

=== Counter-protests ===
On 30 November, counter-protests were held by several Muslim officials and activists, alongside members of other religious communities. Indonesian National Armed Forces Commander Gatot Nurmantyo, Minister of Social Affairs Khofifah Indar Parawansa, Indonesian National Police Chief Tito Karnavian and Islamic activist Yenny Wahid marched in support of interfaith unity as a counterbalance to the protests on the 4 December.

On 4 December 2016, after a non-violent rally was held in the National Monument, a counter-protest rally was held by Muslim officials and government officials. The protest, dubbed as the "We Are One Parade" or "Parade Bhinekka Tunggal Ika" ("Unity in Diversity Parade") was attended by an estimated 1,000 people.

== Trial ==
On 9 May 2017, Ahok was sentenced to two years in prison by North Jakarta District Court after being found guilty of blasphemy and inciting violence. The panel of judges rejected his defence that he referred to a Quranic verse to highlight political discrimination. Based on the court hearing, the panel of judges said that his Thousand Islands speech contained elements of blasphemy. The chief judge maintained that Ahok's statement considered the Al-Maidah verse as a tool to deceive or a source of lies. He said the verse is part of the Quran, and that anyone who quotes it should not have any intent of deception. The judges took into consideration a book Ahok had written in 2008 titled Changing Indonesia. His book was judged as proof that he understood the verse in question. They determined the word aulia ("friends and protectors", or "allies") in the verse could be defined as a leader, thus declaring that Ahok's remarks to be degrading and insulting to the Quran. They also agreed with expert witnesses in the trial that Ahok's remarks were a blasphemous offence.
