= 212th =

212th may refer to:

- 212th Attack Battalion, a fictional battalion from the Star Wars universe
- 212th Division (disambiguation), various military units
- 212th Brigade (United Kingdom)
- 212th Battalion (American Legion), CEF, a unit in the Canadian Expeditionary Force during the First World War
- 212th Coast Artillery (United States), a Coast artillery Regiment in the New York National Guard
- 212th Fires Brigade (United States), an artillery brigade in the United States Army
- 212th Infantry Division (Wehrmacht), raised in August 1939 and remained on garrison duty in Germany until March 1941
- 212th Rescue Squadron, a unit of the Alaska Air National Guard
- 212th Airborne Brigade of the Soviet Union.

== See also ==
- 212 (number)
- 212, the year 212 (CCXII) of the Julian calendar
