= 212: The Power of Love =

- Directed by: Jastis Arimba
- Written by: Jastis Arimba; Ali Eounia
- Produced by: Helvy Tiana Rosa; Jastis Arimba; Oki Setiana Dewi; Erick Yusuf; Imam T Saptono; Asma Nadia
- Starring: Fauzi Baadila; Adhin Abdul Hakim; Hamas Syahid; Asma Nadia; Meyda Sefira; Cholidi Asadil Alam; Erick Yusuf
- Edited by: Weldy Handoko Risan Hadi Saputra
- Music by: Dwiki Darmawan; Jody Handoyo; Ferry Setiawan; Hadrianus Eko
- Production company: Warna Pictures
- Release date: 9 May 2018
- Running time: 110 minutes
- Country: Indonesia
- Language: Indonesia

212: The Power of Love is an Indonesian film which was inspired by the 212 Movement. The film was planned to be released on 2 December 2017, however was delayed until 8 May 2018. The film was highly controversial due to its political message and Indonesian political climate at the time. There were protests against the film in several places in Indonesia and some regions banned the film from appearing in cinema. Despite claims made by production that the film was free from political messages, it was accused of carrying pro-Islamist narration.

== Synopsis ==
The story was centered around Rahmat, a journalist, agnostic, and admirer of Karl Marx who believed that religion was just a political tool. Rahmat was a closed person who had only one close friend, Adhin, who is a photographer. One day, Rahmat's mother suddenly died and he must go back to his village. Rahmat was reluctant to go back to his village for 10 years due to a conflicting view with his father, Kyai Zainal, a conservative Muslim. Later, Zainal wanted to go to attend the 2016 Jakarta protests to "defend the ummah". Rahmat urged his father not to come because, other than his view that the protest was political, he feared it would turn into a riot similar to the May 1998 riots of Indonesia. Later, when Rahmat, already back in Jakarta, heard news about his father being part of a long march of protesters, it prompted him to look for his father and ask him to go home.

== Inaccuracies and controversies ==
Despite claimed as "free of political intention" by the film director Jastis Arimba, the film was accused of being heavily political. The film had been described as "anti-reconstructionism" and diluted many historical aspects of the Aksi Bela Islam, despite using Aksi Bela Islam as its background. The film deleted the central figures on Aksi Bela Islam, Basuki Tjahaja Purnama, Joko Widodo, Prabowo Subianto and even Muhammad Rizieq Shihab, which are the real reasons of Aksi Bela Islam. The film tried to be "apolitical", despite containing strong Islamic right-wing messages, but delivered in a soft way. The film tried to build a message that Aksi Bela Islam is "innocent", "pure", "politically free", "Islamism is soft and friendly", and "powered by love". It also tried to portray how Aksi Bela Islam is soft, full of peace, and promoting tolerances, despite in fact during Aksi Bela Islam rampant racist chantings (mostly anti-Christian and anti-Chinese), hate speeches, and attacks against media crews that covered that event.

The film also falsely depicted Karl Marx the father of communism, with another Karl Marx, a composer. The film also blurred the distinction between what is communism and atheism. The inability to differentiate communism and atheism is also a recurrent theme used by both groups to attack Joko Widodo's administration, despite clear differences between them.

== Reception ==
=== Political uses ===
Being released near the 2019 Indonesian general election and exploiting Aksi Bela Islam, this movie was used by Prabowo Subianto who was opposing Joko Widodo, the sitting president and his rival for the presidency. Prabowo himself endorsed the film and mandated his Great Indonesia Movement Party cadres to see the film.

Islamic Defenders Front also voiced support for the film. The organization also endorsed their members to "white the cinema", mass attending the cinema to support their group and make a record "7 million people" attend the cinema.

Despite subliminal political content of the film, the producers invited orphaned children to see the film freely. Although no regulation barred children from seeing political films, involvement of children in Aksi Bela Islam actions were notorious for exploiting children and including them as part of their mass. Child involvement in Islamist actions so severe, to the point that Indonesia Child Protection Commission criticized the actions, as involvement of children in politics is barred by the law (Law No. 35/2014 Re: Child Protection), and unlawful, but the commission cannot do anything due to mass, rampant, and gross violations. Child involvement in politics grossly neglected by Islamic Defenders Front, PA212, and other Islamic right-wing groups during Aksi Bela Islam and other Islamist events, largely based on public opinion shaping motives and nurturing seeds of future distrust to anyone who opposes the right-wing Islamists.

== Novelization ==
The film had been novelized under title Cinta Menggerakkan Segala (Love Moves Anything).

== Sequels ==
The film followed by many sequels: Hayya: The Power of Love 2 (2019) and Hayya 2: Hope, Dream & Reality (2022). The sequels, however, much talked about suffering life of Muslims, much emphasized on Dawah, and less political.
