= List of statutory rules of Northern Ireland, 2017 =

This is a list of statutory rules made in the Northern Ireland in the year 2017.

== 1-100 ==
Number	Title
1	The Housing Benefit and State Pension Credit (Temporary Absence) (Amendment) Regulations (Northern Ireland) 2017
2	The Air Quality Standards (Amendment) Regulations (Northern Ireland) 2017
3	The Producer Responsibility Obligations (Packaging Waste) (Amendment) Regulations (Northern Ireland) 2017
4	The Insolvency Practitioners (Recognised Professional Bodies) (Amendment) Order (Northern Ireland) 2017
5 (C. 1)	The Criminal Evidence (Northern Ireland) Order 1999 (Commencement No. 11) Order 2017
6 (C. 2)	The Justice (2011 Act) (Commencement No. 10) Order (Northern Ireland) 2017
7	The Education (Student Support) (No.2) (Amendment) and Education (Student Loan) (Repayment) (Amendment) Regulations (Northern Ireland) 2017
8	The Areas of Natural Constraint Regulations (Northern Ireland) 2017 (revoked)
9	The Housing Benefit (Executive Determinations) (Amendment) Regulations (Northern Ireland) 2017
10	The General Dental Services (Amendment) Regulations (Northern Ireland) 2017
11	The Court of Judicature (Non-Contentious Probate) Fees (Amendment) Order (Northern Ireland) 2017
12	The Judgment Enforcement Fees (Amendment) Order (Northern Ireland) 2017
13	The Single Common Market Organisation (Exceptional Adjustment Aid) Regulations (Northern Ireland) 2017
14	The Magistrates’ Courts Fees (Amendment) Order (Northern Ireland) 2017
15	The County Court Fees (Amendment) Order (Northern Ireland) 2017
16	The Court of Judicature Fees (Amendment) Order (Northern Ireland) 2017
17	The Family Proceedings Fees (Amendment) Order (Northern Ireland) 2017
18	The Income Support (Work-Related Activity) and Miscellaneous Amendments Regulations (Northern Ireland) 2017
19	The County Court (Amendment) Rules (Northern Ireland) 2017
20	The A509 Derrylin Road, Kinawley (Abandonment) Order (Northern Ireland) 2017
21	The Former Derriaghy Road, Lisburn (Abandonment) Order (Northern Ireland) 2017
22	The Cusher Road (U8048) and Glenanne Road (C212), Loughgilly (Abandonment) Order (Northern Ireland) 2017
23	The Coronation Park, Dundonald (Abandonment) Order (Northern Ireland) 2017
24	The Carryduff Road and Saintfield Road, Temple Crossroads, Lisburn (Abandonment and Stopping-Up) Order (Northern Ireland) 2017
25	The Motor Vehicles (Compulsory Insurance) Regulations (Northern Ireland) 2017
26	The Police Pensions (Amendment) Regulations (Northern Ireland) 2017
27	The Costs Protection (Aarhus Convention) (Amendment) Regulations (Northern Ireland) 2017
28	The Welfare Supplementary Payment (Amendment) Regulations (Northern Ireland) 2017
29	The Public Service Pensions Revaluation (Prices) Order (Northern Ireland) 2017
30	The Public Service Pensions Revaluation (Earnings) Order (Northern Ireland) 2017
31	The Trunk Roads T1, T3 and T7 (York Street Interchange) Order (Northern Ireland) 2017
32	The Renewable Heat Incentive Scheme (Amendment) Regulations (Northern Ireland) 2017
33	The Grants to Water and Sewerage Undertakers Order (Northern Ireland) 2017
34 (C. 3)	The Roads (Miscellaneous Provisions) (2010 Act) (Commencement No. 1) Order (Northern Ireland) 2017
35	The Housing Benefit (Welfare Supplementary Payment) Regulations (Northern Ireland) 2017
36	The Police Service of Northern Ireland and Police Service of Northern Ireland Reserve (Injury Benefit) (Amendment) Regulations 2017
37 (C. 4)	The Pensions (2015 Act) (Commencement No. 4) Order (Northern Ireland) 2017
38	The Occupational and Personal Pension Schemes (Automatic Enrolment) (Amendment) Regulations (Northern Ireland) 2017
39	The Pension Protection Fund and Occupational Pension Schemes (Levy Ceiling and Compensation Cap) Order (Northern Ireland) 2017 (revoked)
40	The Pension Schemes Act 2015 (Judicial Pensions) (Consequential Provision) Regulations (Northern Ireland) 2017 (revoked)
41	The Parking Places (Disabled Persons’ Vehicles) (Amendment) Order (Northern Ireland) 2017
42	The Parking and Waiting Restrictions (Londonderry) (Amendment) Order (Northern Ireland) 2017
43	The Education (Student Support) (Amendment) (No.2) Regulations (Northern Ireland) 2017
44 (C. 5)	The Pensions (2015 Act) (Commencement No. 5) Order (Northern Ireland) 2017
45	The Social Security (Industrial Injuries) (Prescribed Diseases) (Amendment) Regulations (Northern Ireland) 2017
46 (C. 6)	The Welfare Reform and Work (Northern Ireland) Order 2016 (Commencement No. 2) Order 2017
47	The Guaranteed Minimum Pensions Increase Order (Northern Ireland) 2017
48	The Road Races (Croft Hill Climb) Order (Northern Ireland) 2017
49	The Social Security (Claims and Payments) (Amendment) Regulations (Northern Ireland) 2017
50	The Employment and Support Allowance (Exempt Work & Hardship Amounts) (Amendment) Regulations (Northern Ireland) 2017
51	The Employment and Support Allowance (Consequential Amendments and Transitional and Savings Provisions) Regulations (Northern Ireland) 2017
52	The Employers’ Duties (Implementation) (Amendment) Regulations (Northern Ireland) 2017
53	The Social Security Revaluation of Earnings Factors Order (Northern Ireland) 2017
54	The Automatic Enrolment (Earnings Trigger and Qualifying Earnings Band) Order (Northern Ireland) 2017 (revoked)
55	The Social Fund (Amendment) Regulations (Northern Ireland) 2017
56	The Social Security Benefits Up-rating Order (Northern Ireland) 2017 (revoked)
57	The Occupational Pension Schemes and Social Security (Schemes that were Contracted-out and Graduated Retirement Benefit) (Miscellaneous Amendments) Regulations (Northern Ireland) 2017
58	The Pensions (2015 Act) (Pension Protection Fund: Increased Compensation Cap for Long Service) (Pension Compensation Sharing on Divorce) (Transitional Provision) Order (Northern Ireland) 2017
59	The Pension Protection Fund (Modification) (Amendment) Regulations (Northern Ireland) 2017
60	The Social Security Benefits Up-rating Regulations (Northern Ireland) 2017 (revoked)
61	The State Pension Debits and Credits (Revaluation) Order (Northern Ireland) 2017
62	The Social Security (Income-related Benefits) (Amendment) Regulations (Northern Ireland) 2017
63	The Pensions Increase (Modification) Regulations (Northern Ireland) 2017
64	The Pensions Increase (Review) Order (Northern Ireland) 2017
65	The Bereavement Support Payment Regulations (Northern Ireland) 2017 (revoked)
66	The Pensions (2015 Act) (Consequential, Supplementary and Incidental Amendments) Order (Northern Ireland) 2017
67	The Social Security (Invalid Care Allowance) (Amendment) Regulations (Northern Ireland) 2017 (revoked)
68	The Mesothelioma Lump Sum Payments (Conditions and Amounts) (Amendment) Regulations (Northern Ireland) 2017 (revoked)
69	The Personal Independence Payment (Amendment) Regulations (Northern Ireland) 2017
70	The Housing Benefit and Universal Credit (Size Criteria) (Miscellaneous Amendments) Regulations (Northern Ireland) 2017
71	The Road Races (Tandragee 100) Order (Northern Ireland) 2017
72	The Rates (Small Business Hereditament Relief) (Amendment) Regulations (Northern Ireland) 2017
73	The Social Security (Reciprocal Agreements) Order (Northern Ireland) 2017
74	The Road Races (Cookstown 100) Order (Northern Ireland) 2017
75	The Road Races (Craigantlet Hill Climb) Order (Northern Ireland) 2017
76	The Road Races (North West 200) Order (Northern Ireland) 2017
77	The Road Races (Glens of Antrim Rally) Order (Northern Ireland) 2017
78 (C. 7)	The Rural Needs (2016 Act) (Commencement No. 1) Order (Northern Ireland) 2017
79	The Social Security (Restrictions on Amounts for Children and Qualifying Young Persons) (Amendment) Regulations (Northern Ireland) 2017
80	The Road Races (Drumhorc Hill Climb) Order (Northern Ireland) 2017
81	The Water Environment (Water Framework Directive) Regulations (Northern Ireland) 2017
82	The Road Races (Spamount Hill Climb) Order (Northern Ireland) 2017
83	The Planning (Environmental Impact Assessment) Regulations (Northern Ireland) 2017
84	The Rail Passengers Rights and Obligations (Designation and Enforcement) Regulations (Northern Ireland) 2017
85	The Water Resources (Environmental Impact Assessment) Regulations (Northern Ireland) 2017
86	The Environmental Impact Assessment (Forestry) (Amendment) Regulations (Northern Ireland) 2017
87	The Roads (Environmental Impact Assessment) Regulations (Northern Ireland) 2017
88	The Drainage (Environmental Impact Assessment) Regulations (Northern Ireland) 2017
89	The Motor Cycles (Protective Headgear) (Amendment) Regulations (Northern Ireland) 2017
90	The Equipment and Protective Systems Intended for Use in Potentially Explosive Atmospheres Regulations (Northern Ireland) 2017
91 (C. 8)	The Health (Miscellaneous Provisions) (2016 Act) (Commencement No. 1 and Transitional Provisions) Order (Northern Ireland) 2017
92	The Road Races (Cairncastle Hill Climb) Order (Northern Ireland) 2017
93	The Traffic Weight Restriction (Amendment) Order (Northern Ireland) 2017
94	The Bus Lanes (Albertbridge Road, Belfast – between Castlereagh Street and Newtownards Road) Order (Northern Ireland) 2017
95	The Hannahstown Hill, Belfast (Abandonment) Order (Northern Ireland) 2017
96	The Bann Drive, Londonderry (Footpaths) (Abandonment) Order (Northern Ireland) 2017
97	The Orchard Road Industrial Estate, Strabane (Abandonment) Order (Northern Ireland) 2017
98	The A27 Poyntzpass Road, Scarva (Abandonment) Order (Northern Ireland) 2017
99	The Parking and Waiting Restrictions (Belfast) (Amendment) Order (Northern Ireland) 2017
100	The Parking and Waiting Restrictions (Armagh) Order (Northern Ireland) 2017

== 101-200 ==
Number	Title
101	The Loading Bays on Roads (Amendment) Order (Northern Ireland) 2017
102	The Prohibition of Right-Hand Turn (Ballymena) Order (Northern Ireland) 2017
103	The Parking Places, Loading Bays and Waiting Restrictions (Portadown) (Amendment) Order (Northern Ireland) 2017
104	The Student Fees (Amounts) (Amendment) Regulations (Northern Ireland) 2017
105	The Industrial Training Levy (Construction Industry) Order (Northern Ireland) 2017
106	The Roads (Speed Limit) Order (Northern Ireland) 2017
107	The One-Way Traffic (Belfast) (Amendment) Order (Northern Ireland) 2017
108	The Waiting Restrictions (Glengormley) Order (Northern Ireland) 2017
109	The Parking and Waiting Restrictions (Ballyclare) Order (Northern Ireland) 2017
110	The Parking and Waiting Restrictions (Belfast) (Amendment No. 2) Order (Northern Ireland) 2017
111	The Contracting-out (Transfer and Transfer Payment) (Amendment) Regulations (Northern Ireland) 2017
112	The Road Races (Armoy Motorcycle Road Race) Order (Northern Ireland) 2017
113	The Road Races (Tyrone Stages Rally) Order (Northern Ireland) 2017
114	The Road Races (Garron Point Hill Climb) Order (Northern Ireland) 2017
115	The Road Races (Ulster Rally) Order (Northern Ireland) 2017
116	The Social Security (Miscellaneous Amendments) Regulations (Northern Ireland) 2017
117	The Driving and Motorcycle Instructors (Recognition of European Professional Qualifications) Regulations (Northern Ireland) 2017
118 (C. 9)	The Welfare Reform (Northern Ireland) Order 2015 (Commencement No. 7) Order 2017
119	The Marketing of Fruit Plant and Propagating Material Regulations (Northern Ireland) 2017
120	The Control of Traffic (Cairnshill Drive, Belfast) Order (Northern Ireland) 2017
121	The Parking and Waiting Restrictions (Dromore) Order (Northern Ireland) 2017
122	The Prohibition of Waiting (Schools) (Amendment) Order (Northern Ireland) 2017
123	The Waiting Restrictions (Lisburn) (Amendment) Order (Northern Ireland) 2017
124	The Ormeau Road, Belfast (Footway) (Abandonment) Order (Northern Ireland) 2017
125	The Loading Bays, Motor Hackney Carriages (Belfast) By-Laws, On-Street Parking and Urban Clearways (Amendment) Order (Northern Ireland) 2017
126	The Parking Places (Disabled Persons’ Vehicles) (Amendment No. 2) Order (Northern Ireland) 2017
127	The Bus and Coach Passengers Rights and Obligations (Designation and Enforcement) (Amendment) Regulations (Northern Ireland) 2017
128	The Parking Places, Loading Bay and Waiting Restrictions (Newcastle) (Amendment) Order (Northern Ireland) 2017
129	The Parking and Waiting Restrictions (Strabane) (Amendment) Order (Northern Ireland) 2017
130	The Loading Bays and Parking Places on Roads Order (Northern Ireland) 2017
131	The Roads (Speed Limit) (No. 2) Order (Northern Ireland) 2017
132	The Parking Places (Disabled Persons’ Vehicles) (Amendment No. 3) Order (Northern Ireland) 2017
133	The Taxis (Londonderry) (Amendment) Order (Northern Ireland) 2017
134	The Waiting Restrictions (Giant's Causeway) Order (Northern Ireland) 2017
135	The Parking and Waiting Restrictions (Belfast) (Amendment No. 3) Order (Northern Ireland) 2017
136	The Cycle Routes (Amendment) Order (Northern Ireland) 2017
137	The Waiting Restrictions (Mallusk) Order (Northern Ireland) 2017
138	The Waiting Restrictions (Jordanstown) Order (Northern Ireland) 2017
139	The Public Service Vehicles (Conditions of Fitness, Equipment and Use) (Amendment) Regulations (Northern Ireland) 2017
140	The Motor Vehicles (Construction and Use) (Amendment) Regulations (Northern Ireland) 2017
141	The Taxi Licensing (Amendment) Regulations (Northern Ireland) 2017
142	The Universal Credit (Housing Costs Element for claimants aged 18 to 21) (Amendment) Regulations (Northern Ireland) 2017 (revoked)
143	The Discretionary Financial Assistance (Amendment) Regulations (Northern Ireland) 2017
144	The Universal Credit Housing Costs (Executive Determinations) (Amendment) Regulations (Northern Ireland) 2017
145	The Universal Credit (Benefit Cap Earnings Exception) (Amendment) Regulations (Northern Ireland) 2017
146	The Universal Credit (Miscellaneous Amendments and Transitional and Savings Provisions) Regulations (Northern Ireland) 2017
147	The Universal Credit (Reduction of the Earnings Taper Rate) (Amendment) Regulations (Northern Ireland) 2017
148	The Employment and Support Allowance (Miscellaneous Amendments and Transitional and Savings Provision) Regulations (Northern Ireland) 2017
149	The Road Races (Ulster Grand Prix Bike Week) Order (Northern Ireland) 2017
150	The Road Races (Eagles Rock Hill Climb) Order (Northern Ireland) 2017
151	The Road Races (Sunset Rally) Order (Northern Ireland) 2017
152	The Agriculture (Student fees)(Amendment) Regulations (Northern Ireland) 2017 (revoked)
153	The Road Races (Knockagh Hill Climb) Order (Northern Ireland) 2017
154	The Road Races (Bushwhacker Rally) Order (Northern Ireland) 2017
155	The Seed Potatoes (Amendment) Regulations (Northern Ireland) 2017
156	The Health and Safety (First-Aid) (Amendment) Regulations (Northern Ireland) 2017
157	The Materials and Articles in Contact with Food (Amendment) Regulations (Northern Ireland) 2017
158	The Pension Schemes Act 2015 (Judicial Pensions) (Consequential Provision No. 2) Regulations (Northern Ireland) 2017 (revoked)
159	The Parking and Waiting Restrictions (Belfast) (Amendment No. 4) Order (Northern Ireland) 2017
160	The Parking and Waiting Restrictions (Ballyclare) (Amendment) Order (Northern Ireland) 2017
161	The Glenwood Green, Dunmurry (Abandonment) Order (Northern Ireland) 2017
162	The Loading Bays and Parking Places on Roads (Amendment) Order (Northern Ireland) 2017
163	The Parking and Waiting Restrictions (Dungannon) (Amendment) Order (Northern Ireland) 2017
164	The Roads (Speed Limit) (No. 3) Order (Northern Ireland) 2017
165	The Parking and Waiting Restrictions (Belfast) (Amendment No. 5) Order (Northern Ireland) 2017
166 (C. 10)	The Welfare Reform and Work (Northern Ireland) Order 2016 (Commencement No. 3) Order 2017
167	The Parking and Waiting Restrictions (Belfast) (Amendment No. 6) Order (Northern Ireland) 2017
168	The Prohibition of Waiting (Schools) (Amendment No. 2) Order (Northern Ireland) 2017
169	The One-Way Traffic (Belfast) (Amendment No. 2) Order (Northern Ireland) 2017
170	The B3 Tandragee Road, Markethill (Abandonment) Order (Northern Ireland) 2017
171	The Parking and Waiting Restrictions (Larne) Order (Northern Ireland) 2017
172	The Environmental Impact Assessment (Agriculture) (Amendment) Regulations (Northern Ireland) 2017 (revoked)
173	The Restricted Parking Zone (Skipper Street, Belfast) Order (Northern Ireland) 2017
174	The Loading Bays on Roads (Amendment No. 2) Order (Northern Ireland) 2017
175	The Roads (Classification) Order (Northern Ireland) 2017
176	The Loans for Mortgage Interest Regulations (Northern Ireland) 2017
177	The Waiting Restrictions (Lisburn) Order (Northern Ireland) 2017
178	The Parking Places, Loading Bay and Waiting Restrictions (Downpatrick) Order (Northern Ireland) 2017
179	The Parking and Waiting Restrictions (Whiteabbey) Order (Northern Ireland) 2017
180	The Parking Places on Roads and Waiting Restrictions (Bushmills) Order (Northern Ireland) 2017
181	The Employers’ Duties (Miscellaneous Amendments) Regulations (Northern Ireland) 2017
182	The Parking Places (Disabled Persons’ Vehicles) (Amendment No. 4) Order (Northern Ireland) 2017
183	The Parking Places (Disabled Persons’ Vehicles) (Amendment No. 5) Order (Northern Ireland) 2017
184	The Rate Relief Regulations (Northern Ireland) 2017
185	The Jobseeker's Allowance (Hardship) (Amendment) Regulations (Northern Ireland) 2017
186	The Mesothelioma Lump Sum Payments (Conditions and Amounts) (Amendment) (No. 2) Regulations (Northern Ireland) 2017 (revoked)
187	The Social Security Benefits Up-rating (No. 2) Order (Northern Ireland) 2017 (revoked)
188	The Pharmaceutical Society of Northern Ireland (General) (Amendment) Regulations (Northern Ireland) 2017
189	The Social Security Benefits Up-rating (No. 2) Regulations (Northern Ireland) 2017 (revoked)
190 (C. 11)	The Welfare Reform (Northern Ireland) Order 2015 (Commencement No. 8 and Transitional and Transitory Provisions) Order 2017
191	The Motor Vehicles (Authorised Weight) and (Construction and Use) (Amendment) Regulations (Northern Ireland) 2017
192	The Manor, Blacks Road, Belfast (Abandonment) Order (Northern Ireland) 2017
193	The Granemore Road, Tassagh, Keady (Abandonment) Order (Northern Ireland) 2017
194	The Dalton Street, Belfast (Stopping-Up) Order (Northern Ireland) 2017
195	The Meadow Lane, Portadown (Abandonment) Order (Northern Ireland) 2017
196	The One-Way Traffic (Belfast) (Amendment No. 3) Order (Northern Ireland) 2017
197	The Urban Clearways (Amendment) Order (Northern Ireland) 2017
198	The Environmental Impact Assessment (Agriculture) (Amendment No. 2) Regulations (Northern Ireland) 2017
199 (C. 12)	The Employment Act (Northern Ireland) 2016 (Commencement No. 1) Order (Northern Ireland) 2017
200	The Healthy Start Scheme and Day Care Food Scheme (Amendment) Regulations (Northern Ireland) 2017

=== 201-242 ===
Number	Title
201	The Natural Mineral Water, Spring Water and Bottled Drinking Water (Amendment) Regulations (Northern Ireland) 2017
202	The Waste Management Licensing (Amendment) Regulations (Northern Ireland) 2017
203	The Bereavement Support Payment (No. 2) Regulations (Northern Ireland) 2017 (revoked)
204	The Parking Places, Loading Bay and Waiting Restrictions (Carmel Street and Rugby Road, Belfast) Order (Northern Ireland) 2017
205	The Social Security (Emergency Funds) (Amendment) Regulations (Northern Ireland) 2017
206	The On-Street Parking (Residents Parking Zone – Rugby Road / College Park Avenue Area, Belfast) Order (Northern Ireland) 2017
207	The Northern Ireland Social Care Council (Social Care Workers Prohibition) and Fitness of Workers (Amendment) Regulations (Northern Ireland) 2017
208	The Control of Traffic (“The Dark Hedges”) Order (Northern Ireland) 2017
209	The Control of Traffic (Belfast City Centre) Order (Northern Ireland) 2017
210	The Loading Bays on Roads (Amendment No. 3) Order (Northern Ireland) 2017
211	The Private Water Supplies Regulations (Northern Ireland) 2017
212	The Water Supply (Water Quality) Regulations (Northern Ireland) 2017
213	The Rules of the Court of Judicature (Northern Ireland) (Amendment) 2017
214	The Waiting Restrictions (Saintfield) Order (Northern Ireland) 2017
215	The Parking Places (Disabled Persons’ Vehicles) (Amendment No. 6) Order (Northern Ireland) 2017
216 (C. 13)	The Welfare Reform (Northern Ireland) Order 2015 (Commencement No. 9 and Transitional and Transitory Provisions) Order 2017
217 (C. 14)	The Credit Unions and Co-operative and Community Benefit Societies Act (Northern Ireland) 2016 (Commencement) Order (Northern Ireland) 2017
218	The Social Security (Miscellaneous Amendments No. 2) Regulations (Northern Ireland) 2017
219	The Social Security (Infected Blood and Thalidomide) Regulations (Northern Ireland) 2017
220	The Parking Places, Loading Bays and Waiting Restrictions (Coleraine) (Amendment) Order (Northern Ireland) 2017
221	The Waste (Fees and Charges) (Amendment) Regulations (Northern Ireland) 2017
222	The Seed Marketing (Amendment) Regulations (Northern Ireland) 2017
223	The Recognition and Derecognition Ballots (Qualified Persons) (Amendment) Order (Northern Ireland) 2017
224	The Trade Union Ballots and Elections (Independent Scrutineer Qualifications) (Amendment) Order (Northern Ireland) 2017
225	The Taxis (Taximeters, Devices and Maximum Fares) (Amendment) Regulations (Northern Ireland) 2017
226	The Trunk Road T3 (Western Transport Corridor) Order (Northern Ireland) 2017
227	The State Pension Debits and Credits (Revaluation) (No. 2) Order (Northern Ireland) 2017
228	The State Pension Revaluation for Transitional Pensions Order (Northern Ireland) 2017
229	The Ionising Radiations Regulations (Northern Ireland) 2017
230	The Producer Responsibility Obligations (Packaging Waste) (Amendment No. 2) Regulations (Northern Ireland) 2017
231	The Rates (Unoccupied Hereditaments) (Amendment) Regulations (Northern Ireland) 2017
232	The Occupational Pensions (Revaluation) Order (Northern Ireland) 2017
233	The Novel Foods Regulations (Northern Ireland) 2017
234	Not Allocated
235	The Parking and Waiting Restrictions (Jordanstown, Mallusk and Whiteabbey Amendments) Order (Northern Ireland) 2017
236	The Roads (Speed Limit) (No. 4) Order (Northern Ireland) 2017
237	The C161 Derrycarne Road, Portadown (Abandonment) Order (Northern Ireland) 2017
238	The Waiting Restrictions (Portstewart) Order (Northern Ireland) 2017
239	The Former C158 Ballynacor Road, Portadown (Abandonment) Order (Northern Ireland) 2017
240	The Prohibition of U-Turns (A55 Kennedy Way and B102 Andersonstown Road, Belfast) Order (Northern Ireland) 2017
241	The Human Medicines (Amendment) Regulations 2017
242	The Social Security (Miscellaneous Amendments No. 3) Regulations (Northern Ireland) 2017

== See also ==
- List of acts of the Northern Ireland Assembly
- List of acts of the Parliament of the United Kingdom from 2017
