= Wijayanto =

Islamic preacher from Surakarta, Central Java

Ustad Wijayanto
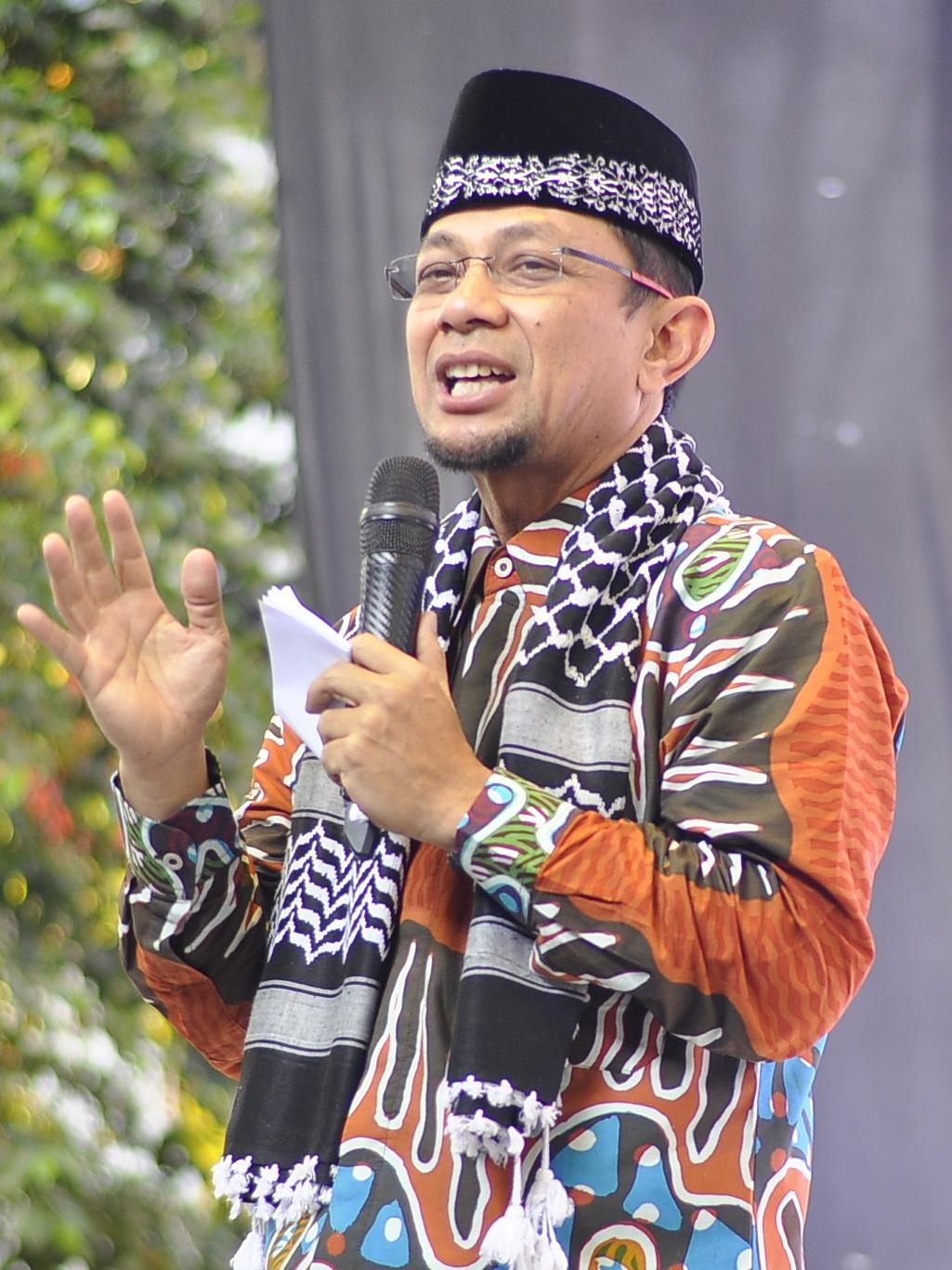
- Wijayanto in 2018
- Born: December 27, 1968 (age 57); Surakarta, Indonesia
- Occupations: da'i ulama
- Spouse: Ulaya Ahdiani
- Children: Dzikrina Iffa Yohanida; Muhammad Nufail Naisaburi; Muhammad Naja El-Ghifari

Wijayanto (born December 27, 1968), colloquially known as Ustadz Wijayanto, is an Islamic preacher, da'i and ulama hailed from Surakarta, Central Java. He often appears in religious studies and Islam related programs on national television. An alumnus of International Islamic University, Islamabad, he is also noted as a lecturer of the department of management in Gadjah Mada University and as the Principal Supervisor of Pesantren Bina Insan Anak Sholeh, Yogyakarta.

== Early life ==
Wijayanto attended from elementary to high school in Surakarta. During the elementary school years, he also studied at the Tafseer Diniyah Assembly, while during the junior high school years he participated in the Islamic boarding school, Al Islam. During his time in Surakarta, he began recognizing his talent in preaching. Subsequently, he continued his studies at the Sunan Kalijaga State Islamic University and graduated as a scholar of tarbiyah (Islamic education) in 1992. In the same year, he also completed a Bachelor's degree in Anthropology at Gadjah Mada University. He then went on to study at International Islamic University in Islamabad majoring in the Master of Sociology and graduated in 1997.

== Career ==
Wijayanto is known as a prominent da'i in Indonesia, characterized by comical and entertaining preaching style. He is famous for his lectures with witty humor and critical comedy reflecting the reality and this is anticipated by his audiences. However, there are critics as well against his way of preaching and pop lectures on TV. Some call him "ustad artist" due to him utilizing his title as ustad to speak and look charming.

In addition to lectures and televangelism, Wijayanto also authors written works. One of his releases is titled Jodohku, Maunya Kamu (lit: I want you as my love of my life, until the end). The book is aimed at addressing the family affairs and social issues, utilizing his knowledge and degree in sociology, and aimed at combining the science of sociology and Islamic knowledge as a preacher in order to contribute to solving the problem.
