= Norwegian Penal Code =

Criminal law of Norway

The Norwegian Penal Code, also known as the Norwegian Criminal Code (Norwegian: Straffeloven) is a Norwegian law that was sanctioned on 20 May 2005 and entered into force ten years later, on 1 October 2015. It replaced the General Civil Penal Code of 1902.

== History ==
The work of drafting the law was initiated by the Ministry of Justice in 1978. The law was sanctioned on 20 May 2005, but the second part of the law, containing the penal provisions, was not completed until 2009. After that, it took six years before the law entered into force. The postponement of the entry into force was due to the police and sheriff services' IT systems having difficulty handling extensive changes. On 13 March 2015, the government of Erna Solberg announced that it had proposed to the Storting that the law should enter into force on 1 October 2015. The law was brought into force by a separate act on commencement.
