= Bachtiar Nasir =

Indonesian Islamic ulama

Ustad Bachtiar Nasir
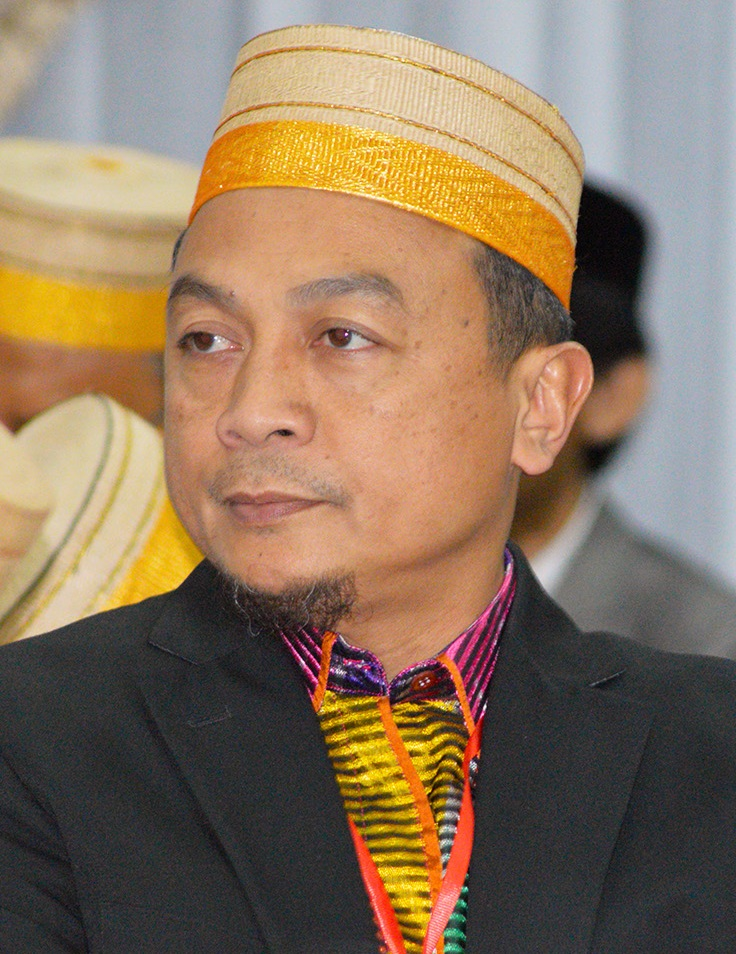
- Born: June 26, 1967 (age 59); Jakarta
- Occupations: da'i, mufassir, ulama

Academic background
- Education: Islamic University of Medina

Bachtiar Nasir (Arabic: الشيخ بختيار ناصر) is an Indonesian Islamist da'i and ulama. He is known for his examination and exploration of the sciences of the Qur'an. The ustad leads the Ar-Rahman Qur'anic Learning Center (AQL) Islamic Center, and also serves as the Secretary General of Intellectual Assembly of Young Ulama Indonesia (MIUMI), Chairman of Alumni of Saudi Arabia in Indonesia, and Chairman of Islamic University of Medina Alumni in Indonesia. He also served as the Central Executive of the Indonesian Ulema Council (MUI).

Nasir often appeared on national television and was a judge on Hafidz Indonesia Event with Ustad Amir Faishol Fath and Syeh Ali Jabeer. His prominence further increased when, as leader of the National Movement of Fatwa Guards Majelis Ulama Indonesia (GNPF-MUI), he spearheaded a protest movement that commenced in November 2016 with the aim of thwarting the re-election bid of then-Jakarta governor Basuki Tjahaja Purnama.

== Early life ==
He completed his secondary education at Pondok Modern Darussalam Gontor in Ponorogo, East Java and Pondok Pesantren Daarul Huffazh in Bone, South Sulawesi. He continued his studies at the Islamic University of Medina in Saudi Arabia.

== Role in anti-Ahok protests ==
Nasir was a prominent figure in the organization of a series of protests staged in Jakarta from November 2016 against then-Jakarta governor Basuki Tjahaja Purnama, better known as Ahok, who was accused of blasphemy. The initial protest involved approximately 50,000 to 200,000 participants. Nasir led the protest movement under the National Movement of Fatwa Guards of the Indonesian Ulema Council (GNPF-MUI). Ahok subsequently lost his bid for re-election in 2017 and was jailed for two years for blasphemy. Media reports described the blasphemy charge as "trumped up" and part of a wider effort to discredit Ahok's ally, President Joko Widodo, ahead of Indonesia's 2019 presidential election.

Bachtiar was invited as a guest by video call to a convention organized by Malaysian Muslim Solidarity, a far right organization in Malaysia in November 2018, two weeks prior to the anti-ICERD rally it organized in Kuala Lumpur on December of same year.

== Controversies ==
Nasir was accused of racism after an interview with Reuters news agency, during which he called the ethnic Chinese minority's wealth in Indonesia a problem of economic inequality that needs to be addressed. "It seems they have not become more generous and juster," he said. In the interview, Nasir also criticized the amount of investment from China which he considered less helpful.

Critics responded that the minority ethnic group does not receive any special treatment from the government and that Nasir was exploiting social inequality as a weapon to incite hatred and scapegoat Indonesia's ethnic Chinese.

In May 2019, police named Nasir a suspect in a money laundering case involving the transfer of funds from the Justice for All Foundation (YKUS). Nasir failed to comply with a third police summons for questioning that month, as he had gone to Saudi Arabia.
