= 2021 Makassar cathedral bombing =

Terrorist incident in Indonesia

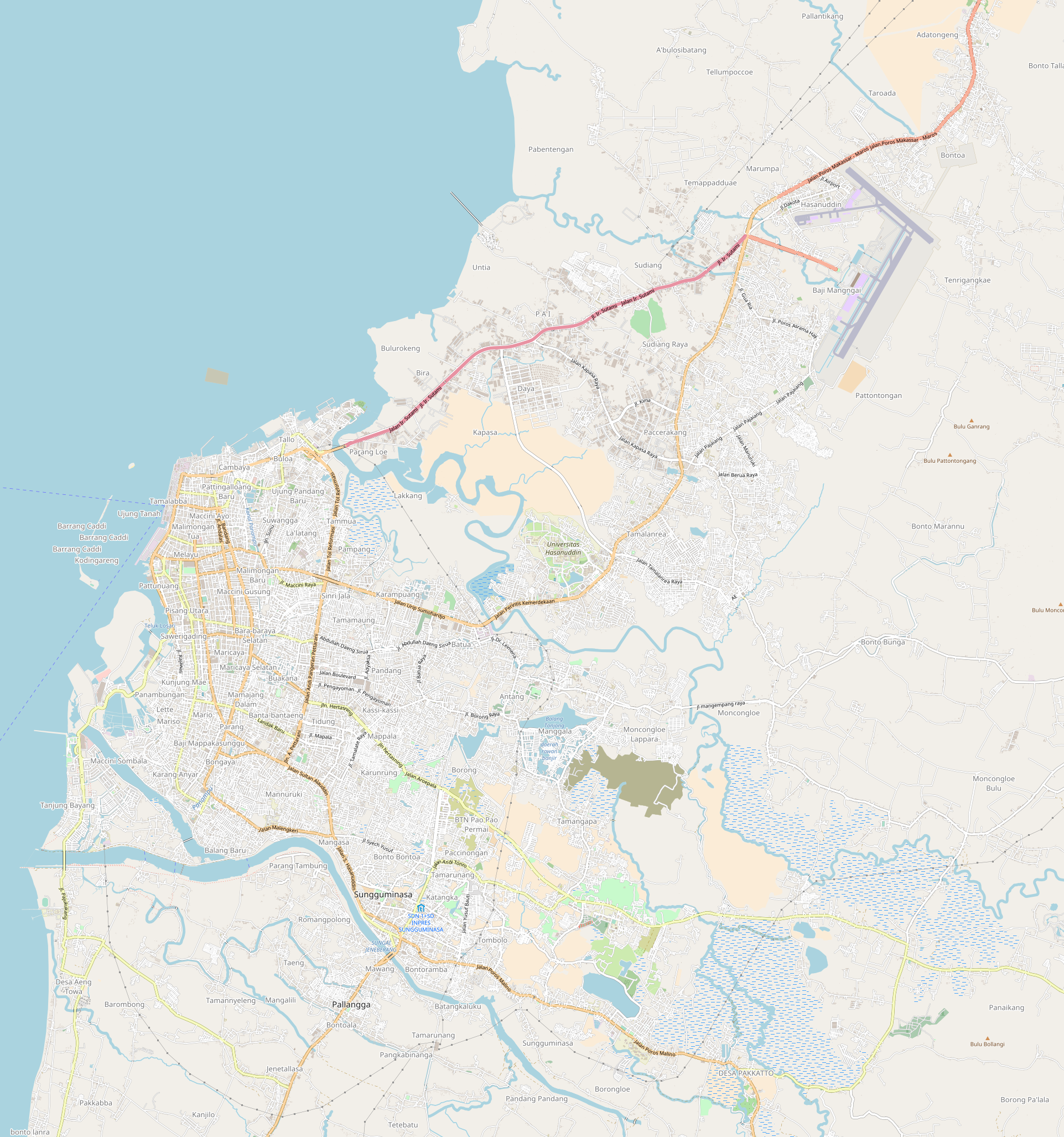
- 2021 Makassar cathedral bombing (Makassar)
- Location: Sacred Heart Cathedral, Makassar, South Sulawesi, Indonesia
- Date: 28 March 2021, Palm Sunday ±10:28 WITA (UTC+8)
- Target: Churchgoers
- Attack type: Suicide bombings, terrorist attack
- Deaths: 2 terrorists
- Injuries: 20
- Perpetrators: Jamaah Ansharut Daulah (suspected); Islamic Defenders Front (alleged support)
- Motive: Anti-Christian sentiment fueled by radical Islamic extremism

The Makassar cathedral bombing was an attack occurred on 28 March 2021, around 10:28 Central Indonesia Time (UTC+8) at the Sacred Heart Cathedral (Indonesian: Gereja Katolik Hati Yesus yang Mahakudus) in Makassar, South Sulawesi, Indonesia, during a Palm Sunday service. It was the first church bombing in Indonesia since the 13 May 2018 bombings of three churches in Surabaya.

== Bombing ==
The bombing happened outside the Sacred Heart Cathedral of Makassar, the oldest church in the city, while a Palm Sunday service was being conducted inside. The explosion occurred at the southeastern gate of the cathedral, near the intersection of Thamrin and Kajaolalido streets. According to police, the perpetrators were riding a motorcycle and intended to enter the church when they were stopped by police in front of the cathedral. When the perpetrators were asked to get off the motorcycle, the blast occurred.

Several churchgoers were reportedly injured in the attack. The South Sulawesi regional police described the incident as a suicide bombing. National Police spokesman Argo Yuwono said there were two perpetrators of the attack.

The bombing location was in the vicinity of Makassar City Police headquarters and City Hall. Human remains were found at the scene. The two perpetrators were the only people killed by the blast, which also injured 20 people. A CCTV recording showed three pedestrians and a car passing the site moments before the explosion occurred.

== Perpetrators ==
The attack was conducted by two suicide bombers riding a Honda Beat motorcycle. The motorcycle's annual taxation was overdue for five months and was not paid.

The Indonesian authorities identified one of the bombers hours after the attack. He was described as a member of a terrorist cell which carried out another attack on a cathedral in Jolo, Philippines, in 2019. The other perpetrator, a woman, by then was under examination. On the next day, the identity of both perpetrators were revealed by the police. The perpetrators were just married for 6–7 months prior to the bombing. They were confirmed as members of the Jamaah Ansharut Daulah. Prior to the action, the husband signed a last will and testament – which subsequently found by the police during a raid on their house – saying about the bombing, farewell messages, and willingness to die as an Islamic martyr. Upon the bombing, the police apprehended many of the perpetrators' accomplices around the country.

An Indonesian scholar on terrorism, Al Chaidar, earlier had said that the attack was carried by Islamic terrorist group Jamaah Ansharut Daulah (JAD), which also responsible for the Jolo attack.

On 30 March 2021, National Police announced a new fact regarding the perpetrators and perpetrators' accomplices in South Sulawesi. It was found that they were joined same JAD's majlis ta'lim (study group) and also pledged allegiance to ISIL's proposed caliphate at one of Islamic Defenders Front (FPI) office in South Sulawesi. Police also revealed the presence of a JAD's study group that involved in determining target, mapping, and planning of the bombing.

Nearly one month after the bombing, on 27 April 2021, former FPI General Secretary and Muhammad Rizieq Shihab's close confidante, Munarman, captured by Police. He was captured due to possessing the knowledge about the terrorist network, but choose to hide it. Not only that he also involved in inciting people to commit terrorism and conspiring with terrorists against the state. He also charged by police to be involved with "bay'ah" of terrorists' group and their pledge of allegiance to ISIL in Makassar, Jakarta, and Medan terror networks.

On 8 December 2021, Munarman trial held. The trial was held in close for public in accordance to the Law on Terrorism, but summary of the trial procession is made available. In the trial several facts brought into the light. Included into summaries were: his involvement in Makassar terror network, his past underground publications praising Al-Qaeda terrorism acts, and his pledge to ISIS.

== Allegations of ex-Islamic Defenders Front ties and support ==
In search of perpetrators' accomplices around the country, National Police launched raids across the country. During raids on various places such as in Condet (East Jakarta), Serangbaru (Bekasi Regency), and Bima, the police found numerous banned organization Islamic Defenders Front (FPI) uniforms, apparels, and membership cards. FPI itself was an Islamic fundamentalist organization led by Rizieq which had been banned by the government in December 2020 for declaring support for ISIL. They also found five unexploded but armed IEDs, explosives precursors enough to make up to 70 bombs, books, and documents. Moreover, one of alleged bomb maker captured in Condet was identified as a member of Laskar Pembela Islam (LPI, Islamic Defenders Paramilitary), the paramilitary wing of the FPI and reported as one among its first members. Another captured member of Condet cell was also identified as a high-ranked FPI member. He is a former vice head of FPI's Department of Jihad and State Defense, which oversees the LPI. He was caught in camera present at Muhammad Rizieq Shihab's trial at the East Jakarta State Court. Despite that, the chairman of Islamic fundamentalist group 212 Movement Alumni, Slamet Ma'arif, denied any FPI involvement. Aziz Yanuar, Rizieq Shihab's lawyer, told that Rizieq knows the former vice head and aware of his capture, but chose not to give any comment.

JAD connection with FPI is still questionable. However, Zainal Anshori, former national leader of JAD, confessed on 9 February 2021, that the current JAD was actually found in 2005 from the disavowed Lamongan branch of FPI. Earlier that month, several members of JAD in Makassar were captured. At that time, it was found that the captured JAD members were also affiliated with FPI.

Further investigation also revealed many former FPI members involved. Confessions of captured members of Makassar terrorist network which were released on 3 March 2021, suggesting that the bombing also partially motivated by trial process of Muhammad Rizieq Shihab and asking for state to release him, at all costs even by force. Aside of this, based from the confessions, Islamic supremacism, nativism, anti-corporatism, and anti-China sentiment elements also take part as the motive of the bombing. The investigations hinted that the cathedral bombing might a part or larger plot involving now former FPI members.

On 27 April 2021, Munarman, former FPI general secretary captured by police. While he was captured in afternoon in his residence, police subsequently launched raid to former FPI headquarters at Petamburan III St., Jakarta. Police confiscated many documents, forbidden attributes, and also large amount of "white powders" (later known as one of explosive precursor, potassium nitrate) and acetone (TATP precursor) stored there.

== Reaction ==
Alissa Qotrunnada, the eldest daughter of former president and democracy activist Abdurrahman Wahid, offered her condolences and condemned the attack as a "wound of the nation". Minister of Religious Affairs Yaqut Cholil Qoumas also condemned the attack. Nahdlatul Ulama condemned the attack, stating that anything that harms social harmony is never justified. Amnesty International condemned the attack as "an insult to human rights principles". Makassar mayor Ramdhan Pomanto urged people to stop sharing photos and video footages of the explosion. He planned to visit the scene and phoned the pastor of the church to confirm that there were no victims from the church's congregation. The Indonesian Churches Fellowship (PGI) asked people to be calm and trust the authorities to investigate the attack, while they also discouraged people from sharing images of the attack. Indonesian vice president Ma'ruf Amin urged police to investigate the attack as fast as possible. President Joko Widodo strongly condemned the attack in a news conference later on.

The chairman of Islamic fundamentalist group 212 Movement Alumni, Slamet Ma'arif, also condemned the bombing and called on the public not to speculate on the motive of the attackers. He claimed that the attack had nothing to do with religion, so the public should instead focus on Muhammad Rizieq Shihab's trial and the police's December 2020 killing towards members of the Islamic Defenders Front.

== Subsequent event ==
On 31 March 2021, the National Police headquarters in Jakarta was attacked by an armed assailant. The assailant, a woman wearing niqāb, was shot dead by the police after firing shots several times.
