= Muhammad Hanif Alatas =

Habib Muḥammad Ḥanīf bin ʿAbd ar-Raḥmān al-Aṭṭās
- محمد حنيف بن عبد الرحمن العطاس
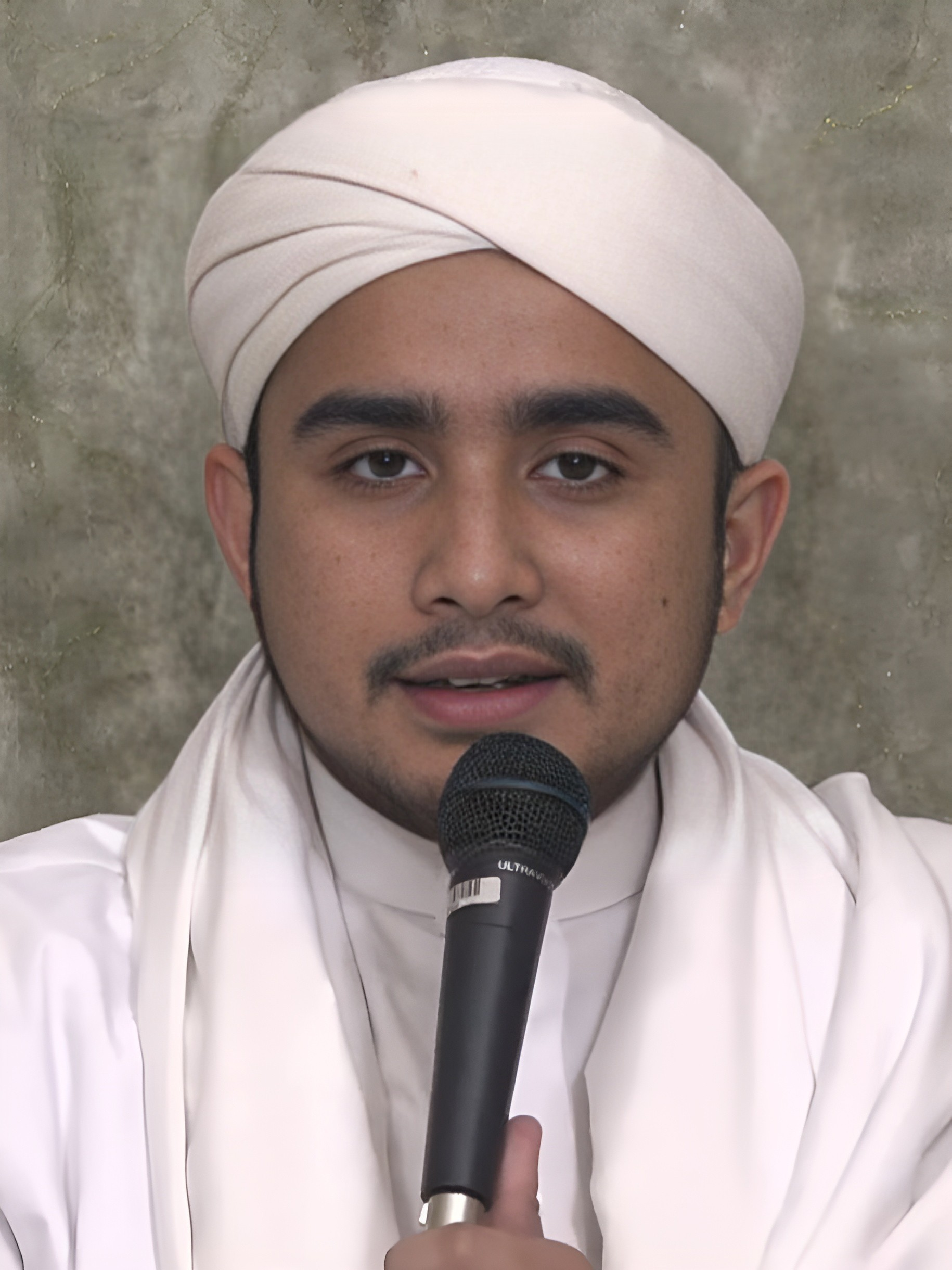
- Hanif in 2023

Personal life
- Born: Muhammad Hanif; 13 January 1993 (age 33) Petamburan, Tanah Abang, Jakarta
- Spouse: Habibah Zulfa Muhammad Rizieq Shihab (m. 2016)
- Parents: Habib Abdurrahman Alatas (father); Habibah Fadhilah Alatas (mother)
- Era: Modern era
- Education: Al-Ahgaff University (bachelor's degree, 2016); Darullughah Wadda'wah International Islamic University (master's degree, 2022)
- Known for: Islamic Defenders Front
- Other name: Habib Hanif
- Relatives: Muhammad Rizieq Shihab (father-in-law)

Religious life
- Religion: Islam
- Denomination: Sunni
- Jurisprudence: Shafi‘i
- Creed: Ashʿari

Muslim leader
- Teacher: Muhammad Rizieq Shihab; Salim bin Abdullah Asy-Syathiri; Umar bin Hafiz

Habib Muhammad Hanif bin Abdurrahman Alatas (Arabic: محمد حنيف بن عبد الرحمن العطاس, romanized: Muḥammad Ḥanīf bin ʿAbd ar-Raḥmān al-Aṭṭās; most commonly known as Habib Hanif; born 13 January 1993) is an Indonesian Islamic cleric, preacher and activist of the Islamic Defenders Front (Indonesian: Front Pembela Islam, abbreviated as FPI). He is the son-in-law of the founder and high priest of FPI, Habib Muhammad Rizieq Shihab. He married Sharifah Zulfa Shihab, Rizieq's daughter, on 17 August 2016. Indonesian government disbanded the FPI on 30 December 2020 for engaging in terrorist and criminal acts and disturbing public order, but its sympathizers then founded a new FPI organization with the acronym Islamic Brotherhood Front (Indonesian: Front Persaudaraan Islam). In 2022, a new FPI management was formed, Hanif himself then served as secretary of the shuro council of the FPI central board.

== Biography ==
Hanif was born in Petamburan, Tanah Abang, Central Jakarta on 20 Rajab 1413 AH as the first of four children of Habib Abdurrahman Alatas and Sharifah Fadhilah binti Ahmadun Alatas. His three siblings are Sholeh Alatas, Syarifah Aisyah Alatas, and Umar Alatas. Both of them are native residents of Petamburan, Central Jakarta, but later moved to the Kembangan area, West Jakarta. His father, Abdurrahman, was one of the figures and founders of the Islamic Defenders Front when it was first formed in 1998.
