= Jailangkung (disambiguation) =

Jailangkung, also called jelangkung, is an Indonesian folk ritual of communicating with spirits of the dead.

Jailangkung or Jelangkung may also refer to:

- Jelangkung (film), 2001 Indonesian horror film directed by Rizal Mantovani and Jose Poernomo
- Jelangkung 3, 2007 Indonesian horror film directed by Angga Dwimas Sasongko
- Tusuk Jelangkung di Lubang Buaya, 2018 Indonesian horror film directed by Erwin Arnada
- Jailangkung: Sandekala, 2022 Indonesian horror film directed by Kimo Stamboel
