= Munarman =

Indonesia Islamist activist

Munarman is the former spokesman of the Islamic Defenders Front (FPI), advocate, former human rights activist, former chairman of the YLBHI, who later became the Commander of the Laskar Islam Command of FPI.

== Personal life ==
Munarman was born and raised in Palembang and is the sixth of 11 children. In 1996 Munarman married Ana Noviana and settled in Palembang. From this marriage Munarman was given with three children, namely Rio Mohammad Alfarez, Rinaldo Mohammad Montazeri and the last one was born in September 2008, when Munarman left prison for six hours to see him after his birth. Munarman and his family lived separately with regular meetings on the weekends until his move to Jakarta in 2000. Previously his family had lived with Munarman's family in Palembang.

Munarman's parents say that they have not had much communication since Munarman is busy with his job in Jakarta, although they do say that they have visited Jakarta. Information about Munarman was obtained by his family via television broadcasts.

== Controversy ==
Munarman became one of the opponents of the existence of Ahmadiyah, in Indonesia along with several other Islamic figures in Indonesia. In the Monas incident on June 1, 2008, related to the attacks and violence carried out by FPI and Laskar Islam against the AKK-BB mass, around 500 people beat AKK-BB rally participants and damaged motorized vehicles at Monas. appeared in a June 2008 news recording on Metro TV, claiming to be responsible as the Laskar Islam Commander for causing the incident. He asked the police not to secretly arrest his men, but just arrest him as chairman. On 4 June 2008, around 1,500 police officers were dispatched to the FPI Headquarters in Petamburan, Jakarta, after none of the FPI surrendered. Munarman disappeared and refused to turn himself in. He also became a police fugitive after being named a suspect, and entered into the top DPO (wanted list) along with several people involved in the action by the Indonesian Police (Polri) and its ranks below (including all Polda throughout Indonesia) to be examined and questioned as a result of being involved in the incident. He became viral and infamous after an incident in national television where he threw a glass of hot tea to the face of Professor Thamrin Tamagola.
