= Erwin Arnada =

Indonesian journalist and filmmaker

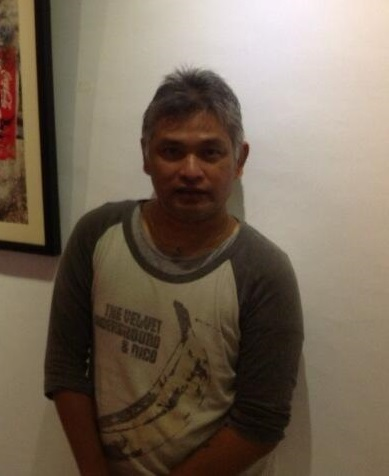
- Arnada in October 2013
- Born: 17 October 1963 (age 63); Jakarta, Indonesia
- Education: University of Indonesia
- Occupations: Journalist, filmmaker
- Years active: 1986 – present
- Notable work: Playboy Indonesia; Rumah di Seribu Ombak

Erwin Arnada (born 17 October 1963) is an Indonesian journalist and filmmaker. Born to a devout Muslim family in Jakarta, Erwin became interested in journalism in 1984, and, after a time as a photographer, he interned at the weekly Editor. Beginning in 1990 he took editorial roles in various print media, including the controversial tabloid Monitor. Erwin entered cinema in 2000, producing several films for Rexinema.

After establishing Playboy Indonesia in 2006 Erwin became the center of controversy, as Islamic groups such as the Islamic Defenders Front protested the magazine as indecent – despite it not featuring any nudity. After an extended series of trials Erwin was convicted by the Supreme Court of Indonesia and sentenced to two years in prison, beginning in October 2010. He was released the following June, when the court reversed its decision. In 2012 Erwin was nominated for a Citra Award for Best Director for his film Rumah di Seribu Ombak, based on a novel he had written in prison.

In 2023, Erwin then decided to publish the story of the publishing of Playboy Indonesia in a book entitled “Rabbit In Prison”. Published by Yayasan Okky Madasari (OM Institute) and edited by Moch Aldy MA. The book was launched on October 21, 2023 during the Ubud Writers & Readers Festival in Bali.

== Early life and career ==
Erwin Arnada was born on 17 October 1963 to Amin Ismail, a Minangkabau trader and part-time journalist, and his wife. The family owned several shops in Jakarta, including one in Blok M and another in Tanah Abang. Beginning when he was in junior high school Arnada helped the family with the shops, using his free time to read. Arnada was raised in a Muslim family and has remained a devout Muslim.

Arnada attended the University of Indonesia, working towards a degree in Russian literature. He became interested in journalism through photography. After viewing Roger Spottiswoode's 1983 film Under Fire, which followed an American photojournalist covering the Nicaraguan Revolution, Arnada applied to be a photographer for the daily newspaper Kompas. After his application was refused, in 1986 Arnada found work with the Jakarta-based football team Persija Jakarta.

== Journalism ==
Beginning in 1989 Arnada began an internship with the weekly Editor. He used the position as a learning experience. Arnada served as an editor of the Jakarta-based tabloid Monitor between 1990 and 1991. The publication was shut down after it published a controversial poll of readers' most respected figures; the poll showed the Islamic prophet Muhammad at number 10, below the dangdut singer Rhoma Irama.

By the mid-1990s Arnada had begun working for Bintang Indonesia, owned by the Ciputra family. He left the newspaper in 1999 as he considered the publication to devote too little space to music. He established Bintang Milenia that year, but by 2002 it had been shut down. During this time he worked extensively with MTV Indonesia and various start-ups.

After the closing of Bintang Milenia, Arnada began working with Indonesian filmmakers Rizal Mantovani, Jose Poernomo and Dimas Djayadiningrat to establish the production company Rexinema. The company's first production was Jelangkung in 2001; Arnada first received credit for Tusuk Jelangkung in 2002, which he wrote and produced. He worked on a further six films with the company between 2003 and 2007.

== Playboy Indonesia ==
Arnada began plans to establish Playboy Indonesia, an Indonesian version of the American men's magazine Playboy, as a challenge. He considered the magazine more than "pornography", describing it as home to "edgy and award-winning journalism pieces" which he wanted to bring to Indonesia. Arnada entered discussions with Christie Hefner, then head of Playboy Enterprises, in November 2005. He received permission to publish an Indonesian edition the next January. The first issue was launched in April 2006 and did not feature any nudity or focus on sexuality. Instead, the models were fully clothed; the issue also included an interview with author Pramoedya Ananta Toer. Later articles continued to deal with literature, as well as human rights and politics.

The magazine was, however, highly controversial. Before publication Muslim groups had expressed opposition. After publication began the Playboy Indonesia offices were attacked, as were various printers. In one instance the Islamic Defenders Front attacked the Playboy Indonesia offices in South Jakarta, leading to the building being evacuated. By May 2006 the continuous protests had left the magazine without an office. The bad publicity led advertisers to abandon the magazine. Ultimately the magazine was shut down after releasing ten issues, having moved to the predominantly Hindu island Bali since its second issue, in June 2006.

For his role in Playboy Indonesia's publication Arnada came under investigation. Investigators cited his publication of "pornographic" materials, illegal in Indonesia, as evidence of criminal indecency. On trial in April 2007, the South Jakarta District Court rejected this claim; an appeal at the Jakarta High Court affirmed this decision. After two years of appeals by prosecutors, the case reached the Supreme Court of Indonesia. The Supreme Court ruled against Arnada and sentenced him to two years in prison. In October 2010 Arnada was imprisoned in Cipinang Penitentiary Institution in Jakarta. He used this time to write three novels: Rumah di Seribu Ombak (House of the Thousand Waves), Midnite di Negeri Nonsense (Midnight in the Land of Nonsense), and Rabbit Versus Goliath.

Arnada was released in June 2011, after the Supreme Court agreed with his defense that a journalist's professional acts should be tried under the Press Code and not Criminal Code. Numerous commentators, including Arnada, described it as a victory for the country's freedom of press. However, responding to calls that he was a hero, Arnada stated "I’m not a hero, nor a victim. I’m just another version of history"; he considered his experience less drastic than that of journalists elsewhere in the country. In a 2013 interview Arnada stated that his incarceration had "muted his 'insane ambitions'"; Arnada's friends stated that he had been deeply changed by the term.

== Post-imprisonment ==
Arnada released his novel Rumah di Seribu Ombak in early 2012; it had been written while he was in prison. Set in Singaraja, Bali, the novel followed the friendship of two young boys from different cultural backgrounds. He adapted the novel later that year, serving as director and producer. The film was a critical success and nominated for nine Citra Awards at the 2012 Indonesian Film Festival, including Citra Award for Best Director for Arnada. It won four, including Best Editing and Best Screenplay; Arnada lost the Best Director award to Herwin Novianto of Tanah Surga... Katanya (Land of Heaven... They Say).

As of 2013 Arnada is married to Hevie Ursulla Arnada, with whom he lives in Bali. He has expressed interest in continuing his career as a novelist, ignoring journalism as it offers "nothing new, nothing different." Alta Loma Entertainment planned to make a movie based on his life.

== Filmography ==
As of 2013 Arnada has been involved with nine feature films, mostly as producer.

- Tusuk Jelangkung (2002) – executive producer, story
- 30 Hari Mencari Cinta (2003) – producer,
- Catatan Akhir Sekolah (2004) – producer
- Cinta Silver (2004) – producer, story
- Alexandria (2005) – producer, story
- Jelangkung 3 (2007) – producer, screenwriter
- Jakarta Undercover (2007) – producer, story
- Asmara Dua Diana (2009) – producer
- Rumah di Seribu Ombak (2012) – director, producer, story

== Works cited ==
- "Erwin Arnada | Filmografi" [Erwin Arnada | Filmography]. filmindonesia.or.id (in Indonesian). Konfiden Foundation. Archived from the original on 2 January 2014.
- "Former 'Playboy' editor walks free on historical ruling". The Jakarta Post. 25 June 2011. Archived from the original on 2 January 2014.
- Ginting, Alfred Pasifico (8 August 2011). "Erwin Arnada: I'm Not a Hero Nor a Victim. I'm Just Another Version of History". Rolling Stone Indonesia (in Indonesian). Archived from the original on 17 January 2013.
- Juniartha, I Wayan (15 June 2006). "'Playboy' magazine's relocation stirs up fresh controversy". The Jakarta Post. Archived from the original on 2 January 2014.
- Mahditama, Iman (25 January 2013). "Erwin Arnada: Having the time of his life". The Jakarta Post. p. 28. Archived from the original on 2 March 2013.
- Mardiyati, Ade (3 November 2011). "Erwin Arnada: A Free Man With No Time to Play". Jakarta Globe. Archived from the original on 15 December 2012.
- "Rexinema Multimedia Pratama". filmindonesia.or.id (in Indonesian). Jakarta: Konfiden Foundation. Archived from the original on 2 January 2014.
- "Rumah di Seribu Ombak". filmindonesia.or.id (in Indonesian). Konfiden Foundation. Archived from the original on 2 January 2014.
- Ryanto, Tony (19 April 2003). "Arnada excels in digital flicks". The Jakarta Post. Archived from the original on 2 January 2014.
- "Tanah Surga... Katanya". filmindonesia.or.id (in Indonesian). Jakarta: Konfiden Foundation. Archived from the original on 2 January 2014.
- Taufiqurrahman, M. (5 May 2006). "Erwin Arnada: 'Playboy' editor in the eye of the storm". The Jakarta Post. Archived from the original on 2 January 2014.
