= Playboy Indonesia =

Magazine franchise

The premiere issue of Playboy Indonesia, featuring model Andhara Early.

Playboy Indonesia is a franchise of Playboy magazine in Indonesia. The magazine was first published in April 2006. It is published by Velvet Silver Media and edited by Erwin Arnada. This edition of the magazine is notable in that it features no nudity and that it is the first Playboy to be published in a Muslim-majority country since a Turkish edition that was discontinued in the mid-1990s.

Despite tailoring the magazine to conservative local sensibilities, with fully clad models and articles such as an interview with dissident author Pramoedya Ananta Toer, the magazine's premiere issue on April 6, 2006, raised significant controversy. Islamist groups such as Majelis Mujahidin Indonesia (MMI) and the Islamic Defenders Front (FPI) staged large protests as well as legal challenges to the magazine. One of the more violent protests in Jakarta caused the owner of the ASEAN Aceh Fertilizer Building, where the Playboy office was located, to evict Velvet Silver Media.

The magazine then moved its headquarters to Bali, which is predominantly Hindu and less restrictive than Islamic-ruled Jakarta, and put out its second issue in June 2006. The second issue carried no advertisements. Around 100,000 copies of each edition were printed and both sold out. Major advertisers returned for the third issue in July.

As a result of the legal challenges, police in Jakarta investigated models Andhara Early and Kartika Gunawan, who posed in the first issue, declaring them suspects for violating indecency rules. The magazine's editor-in-chief, Erwin Arnada, was also questioned. He was charged with violating the indecency provisions of the criminal code, but acquitted the following year. However, by 2010 he was back in prison for publication of (non-nude) pictures.

On 24 June 2011, Arnada was released after a successful appeal to the Supreme Court. His lawyer praised the release as a triumph for freedom of the press in this predominantly Muslim country.

The controversy surrounding Playboy in Indonesia punctuated the issue of pornography legislation opposed by prominent Indonesian feminists, including Kamala Chandrakirana, chairwoman of the National Commission on Violence Against Women, who spoke openly in support of Playboy Indonesia.

In an editorial in the June issue, Arnada wrote: "The absence of a growing monopoly of a set of values and views in our beloved country in the end is our final purpose. We believe that is also the target of all of us who live with reason and want to understand the meaning of democracy and a pluralistic society."

In 2023, the former Editor-in-Chief of Playboy Indonesia, Erwin Arnada, decided to publish a story about the history of Playboy Indonesia magazine in a book titled Rabbit In Prison. Published by Yayasan Okky Madasari (OM Institute) and edited by Moch Aldy MA, the book was launched on October 21, 2023, at the Ubud Writers & Readers Festival in Bali.
