= Decree on Islamic Defenders Front =

Content of the decree on banning FPI

The Decree on Islamic Defenders Front or Joint Decree 220-4780/2020, M.HH-14.HH.05.05/2020, 690/2020, 264/2020, KB/3/XII/2020, 320/2020 is a decree enacted by six ministries and departments in Indonesia to prohibit any activity related to the Islamic Defenders Front (FPI) and the use of its related symbols. The decree was enacted on 30 December 2020, and is currently in force. The decree was read by Deputy Minister of Human Rights and Law, Eddy Hiariej. The Indonesian government argues that the Islamic Defenders Front and its members violated the law and accuse its members of links to terrorists, justifying the ban. The decree prohibits any association with Islamic Defender Fronts and justifies the arrest of anyone involved in its activities or carrying any symbols related to it. The ministers of the Ministries of Home Affairs, Law and Human Rights, Communication and Information Technology, the Attorney General, the Chief of the National Police, and the National Counter Terrorism Agency signed the law.

== Background ==
=== Call for disbandment ===
Calls to disband the Islamic Defenders Front (FPI) began in June 2000, after FPI members attacked the National Commission on Human Rights headquarters. The agency had been investigating the Indonesian Army's former General Wiranto's involvement in various human rights violations during the May 1998 riots and the Indonesian occupation of East Timor. Although the FPI was established by hard-line Islamic scholars, they supported right-wing elements in politics and the military, which supported former president Suharto and tried to prevent this from coming to light.

Over the years, the increased vigilantism of the FPI worried the public and caused unrest for many Indonesians. There have been demands by Indonesians, mainly mainstream Muslims, other religious organizations, political communities and ethnic groups, for the FPI to be disbanded or banned. In the aftermath of the Monas Incident, the moderate Islamic organization, Nadhlatul Ulama, and its wings sent an open letter to Indonesia's then-president, Susilo Bambang Yudhoyono (SBY), calling on the government to take action against the FPI by disbanding it and any of its factions. Former president Abdurrahman Wahid, in the aftermath of that incident, voiced his support for disbanding the FPI after visiting the victims of its attack, saying he disagreed with its use of violence and its threats against national security and safety. However, he said law enforcement agencies had not disbanded the FPI because it was "supported by law enforcement".

A collaborative study undertaken by Arizona State University Tempe, the Singapore Institute of Management, Sunan Kalijaga State Islamic University, and Manado State Islamic College, published in 2013, found that there was collusion between the government and factions of the state security forces with the FPI for their own gain.

The study revealed the FPI enjoyed legislative protection then. There was an attempt to disband it by the SBY administration. Gamawan Fauzi, the Minister of the Interior, studied ways to end FPI activity and disestablish the organization. However, piece of legislation at that time, Ormas Law (Law No. 17 of 2013), required that the disbanding process must be exhaustive and finally must be supported by a court decision. The regulation at the time prevented the government from easily disbanding an organization. Such a lengthy and exhaustive process made the disbandment process one that was no longer pursued.

Over time, because of the state's uncertain future and its lack of control, the FPI's influence and actions grew. The FPI used Islamic jargon to further cement its influence. At its peak of power, there was a perception that "whoever is against the FPI was against Islam". Such a perception made the situation very difficult.

=== Loss of government support and disbandment by Jokowi administration ===
Over time, the FPI gradually lost political favor with the ruling government. Despite that, the FPI still maintained a militant mass of individuals under its umbrella. Until the end of the SBY administration, the FPI enjoyed a good relationship with government. During 2014, the FPI took a stance against Jokowi even before his rise to the presidency. After Jokowi gained the presidency, the FPI participated in various anti-government actions. It now became a pressure group to bring pressure against Jokowi and his administration. Islamic far-right groups and the Islamist Party, such as the Prosperous Justice Party, used the FPI to mount opposition, despite this possibly resulting in further polarization of the Indonesian people. During Jokowi's presidency, the FPI also led various Islamist mass protests known as Aksi Bela Islam (Actions 411, 212, 313, 11–2, 21–2, 31–3, 5-5, and so on) which tried to undermine Jokowi's presidency and used identity politics leading to launch a smear campaign against Jokowi, branding him as an "un-Islamic leader". This resulted in not only electoral defeats in Islamic provinces like Aceh, West Sumatra, Riau, Banten, West Java, West Nusa Tenggara during the election, but unsuccessful government programs in those areas. Jokowi grew tired of the FPI and its use of identity politics. The FPI used political buzzers (social media political operators tasked with making particular online conversation subjects trend), online or not, not only for smearing anyone who opposed them but also to build their own image which seems grandiose to commoners and layman, to make them appear "big" and "holy", when in truth they are demonizing and harmful.

In a post-return action celebrating the return of Muhammad Rizieq Shihab, the hardline Islamist scholar, the FPI launched the "Revolusi Akhlak" ("Moral Revolution") campaign. Despite its name, the proposed revolution does not emphasize the change of one's morals, but revolution against Indonesian leaders Shihab saw as "immoral leaders" and their "immoral leadership" worthy of being toppled. Shihab promoted Indonesia's transformation turned into a Sharia-based country with Tauhid as the basis of the state system. He also threatened to use weapons to wage open war against the government if, as it claimed, they must keep the "Ulamas ... oppressed", further escalating political tension. Fadhli Harahab, a political analyst, denounced Shihab's so -called revolution as "camouflage of seditious acts" He added Shihab is a hypocrite, as his acts and those of the FPI are immoral and are contrary to Islamic moral standards. He warned the public not to swallow Shihab's misleading statements.

Back in 2017, in a shocking move, Joko Widodo and his administration issued Government Regulation instead of Law No. 2/2017. The Government Regulation (later signed into law as Law No. 16 of 2017) amended the previous Ormas Law (Law No. 17 of 2013). The new law removed the need for a lengthy process and a court decision to disband an unruly and threatening organization for the sake of national unity and integrity and maintaining peace and order. The new law made it much easier for the government to disband an organization, despite many Indonesian human rights activists maintaining this law might violate human rights in an authoritarian manner. Despite that opposition, the government banned Hizbut Tahrir Indonesia (HTI) on 19 July 2017 using the new law. After the banning of the HTI, far-right Indonesian Islamic group, including the FPI, feared their existence might be threatened by the law.

On 30 December 2020, like the HTI, the FPI was finally banned using the same law. The ban was announced after the capture of FPI leader, Muhammad Rizieq Shihab, on 13 December 2020 for violating Indonesia's COVID-19 restrictions and anti-government incitement.

== Content ==
The decree is six pages long decree divided into three parts detailing with justifications, considerations, and decisions on why the FPI should be banned.

The justification part contains seven points, summarized as:

1. For the sake of preserving state ideology and basic state consensus: Pancasila, 1945 Constitution, state integrity, and Bhinneka Tunggal Ika, the law regulating community/mass organization had been enacted (Law No. 16 of 2017 as Amendment of Law No. 17 of 2013 (Law of Community/Mass Organization), in Indonesia colloquially called the "Undang - Undang Ormas/UU Ormas" ("Ormas Law")).
2. The FPI organization constitution had been proved to conflict with the law.
3. The FPI Certification of Registration, Certification of Registration No. 01-00-00/010/D.III.4/VI/2014 dated 20 June 2014, was valid until 20 June 2019, but the FPI does not fulfil the requirements to extend the certificate past that time. Since the expiration date, FPI was dissolved de jure.
4. As Ormas Law prescribed, a community/mass organization must not commit acts against the law.
5. FPI members and administrators (and also ex-members and ex-administrators) had been found to be participating in terrorism (35 individuals, with 29 already sentenced), and other criminal acts (206 individuals, with 100 already sentenced).
6. The FPI also participated in illegal sweepings, which sweepings must be performed by authorities.
7. The Ministry of Home Affairs, Ministry of Law and Human Rights, Ministry of Communication and Information Technology, Attorney General, Chief of the National Police, and National Counter Terrorism Agency needed to issue the decree.

The consideration part contained references to establish the decree. The consideration part referring Constitution of Indonesia, related laws in force, and a Constitutional Court Decision.

1. UUD 1945 (Art. 28, 28C verse 2, 28E verse 3, and 28J)
2. Law No. 39 of 1999 (Law of Human Rights)
3. Law No. 9 of 2015 as Amendment of Law No. 23 of 2014 (Law of Local Government)
4. Law No. 16 of 2017 as Amendment of Law No. 17 of 2013 (Law of Community/Mass Organization)
5. Constitutional Court Decision No. 82/PUU-XI/2013 dated 23 December 2014

The decision part, deciding:

1. Declaring the FPI as unregistered organization, hence dissolved de jure.
2. However, even though already dissolved de jure, the FPI continues to commit acts that disturb the peace, are against public order, and against the law.
3. Forbidding any activities and display of any symbols and attributes of the FPI.
4. If an offense is found as detailed in decision No. 3, law enforcement officers can take proper action to stop the activity.
5. Asking the people:
  1. Not to be influenced by FPI activities.
  2. To report to law enforcement officers the sighting any activities and use of FPI symbols and attributes.
6. To assign the signatories of the decree (the ministries, police, and counter terrorism agency) to coordinate with each other and take proper legal actions as prescribed by the law.
7. The decree is effective on the date of stipulation.

== Follow-up and derivatives ==
The chief of the Indonesian National Police issued an edict known as Chief of Indonesian National Police Edict No. Mak/1/I/2021. The edict prohibited involvement of the public, both directly or indirectly, in FPI or FPI-related activity, encouraged the public to report any FPI symbols, encouraged Municipal Police (Satpol-PP) (with support of TNI - POLRI) to clear the symbols, banners, posters, pamphlets, etc., and prohibited any sharing, access, and creation of content related to Islamic Defender Fronts online. The last point in the edict caused concern among journalists, as it may limit them in relating news about the FPI. However, the Indonesia National Police ensured the edict does not conflict with the rights of journalists as provided and protected by Law in Press (Law No. 40 of 1999). Inspector General Argo Yuwono, head of the Indonesia National Police Public Relations Division, later clarified that as long as the content is not a hoax, inciting conflicts, division, ethnic-race-religion (SARA) sensitive, and potentially causing public disorder and threatening public safety and security, it is still allowed.

Soon after the decree was announced, on 30 December 2020, Minister of Administrative and Bureaucratic Reform, Tjahjo Kumolo, announced that a rule to regulate public servants not joining the FPI or participating in FPI activities was tabled by the Ministry with the State Civil Apparatus Commission, and the Civil Service Agency. Sanctions were being decided, with severe punishment leading to the proposal to fire the guilty public servant. On 25 January 2021, the Ministry with the Civil Service Agency issued Joint Decree No.2/2021 2/SE/I/2021. The decree forbids state civil apparatus members to be part of, affiliated with, or supporting illegal organizations. The decree also explicitly mentioned the FPI along with previously banned organizations in Indonesia like the Communist Party of Indonesia, Jamaah Islamiyah, Millah Abraham (more well known in Indonesia as Gerakan Fajar Nusantara or Gafatar), Hizbut Tahrir Indonesia (HTI), and the Jamaah Ansharut Daulah (JAD). Sanctions included firing of the public servant.

Minister of Communication and Information Technology, Johnny G. Plate, announced that internet activity of the FPI or related to it will be prohibited and limited. He added he will clean Indonesian digital space. The ministry also coordinated with the Indonesian National Police, the Indonesian State Intelligence Agency, and various Internet service providers, and digital platform companies that operate in Indonesia to ensure it will happen.

On 5 January 2021, the Indonesian Financial Transaction Reports and Analysis Center (PPATK), the Indonesian financial intelligence agency, temporarily suspended activities and transactions of the FPI and its affiliates financial accounts. 59 bank accounts were suspended. The suspension was enforced as a follow up to the decree. These accounts are currently being investigated for any suspicious transactions related to money laundering or financial crime or any criminal crimes committed by the FPI. M. Natsir Kongah, head of PPATK Public Relation Division, mentioned that more than "hundreds of millions rupiahs" are frozen from the 59 bank accounts. Further analysis by PPATK increased the number of suspended accounts to 92. On 31 January 2021, PPATK submitted their investigation report to the Indonesian National Police's Criminal Investigation Agency. On 2 February 2021, the Criminal Investigation Agency's General Crime Directorate announced the opening of a case. During the announcement, representatives from the Police's Special Economy Crime Directorate, Special Detachment 88, and PPATK investigators were present.

== Response ==
After the official disbanding of the FPI, its central committee and many FPI branches reacted strongly. South Sulawesi Regional FPI claimed the disbandment of the FPI is a "great disaster for Muslims and Islam". The Central Java Regional FPI vowed to rebuild the organization again after Jokowi's presidency, or soon after so-called "regime change". The FPI Solo branch announced another name and form of the FPI would surface. The FPI Cianjur branch also lamented the government's disbandment decision. Sugito Atmo Prawiro, one of Muhammad Rizieq Shihab's lawyers, said the FPI's central committee will discuss the future of the FPI, either transforming into a new organization or changing its form into some kind of majlis ta'lim (lit. 'study assembly').

Soon after its disbandment, a tweet on the FPI's main Twitter account announced the formation of the Front Pejuang Islam (English: Islamic Fighters Front) with a new motto Tetap Tegak Walau Tangan Terikat (English: Always Stand Up Straight Even Hands Are Bound), and tried to agitate the police and the military who are taking down any FPI groups in Petamburan FPI HQ. Separately before the announcement, the Ciamis branch of the FPI announced the same replacement name as the FPI. The FPI vowed to fight their disbandment in court.

Many parties appreciated the FPI disbandment. The Indonesian Democratic Party of Struggle (PDI-P) supported the move by the government, believing it had been made "after deep and careful study". Nasdem also supported the move. Golkar supported the government's decision and claimed the move is had been anticipated for a long time as "the public had known their (the FPI) track record". The United Development Party (PPP) supported the government's decision for the sake of "public safety and national integrity". The Gerindra, a long-time ally of the FPI, criticized the decision as "unlawful" and "unconstitutional" although they supported the government's move to weed out radicalism and its movements. Muhammadiyah also responded and asked the government to remain just and fair, while its youth wing, Pemuda Muhammadiyah, supported the government's move and its decision. Nahdlatul Ulama responded that any organizations must meet the legal standing to operate in Indonesia. The Prosperous Justice Party (PKS), continued to support the FPI and criticized the government move, claiming the FPI was still needed to maintain the democratic process and empower the opposition against the current government. They claimed the government had "already failed" to ensure freedom of speech and organization as outlined in the constitution.

== Criticism ==
The Indonesian Youths' National Committee (KNPI) criticized the dissolution as unfair because the FPI was unlike the Communist Party of Indonesia (PKI), which was attempting a coup. Aziz Yanuar, an attorney for Muhammad Rizieq Shihab, criticized the dissolution as a diversion from the case of the shooting of six FPI members in December 2020. The Secretary General of the Indonesian Ulema Council (MUI), Amirsyah Tambunan, said "education is much better than dissolution". Politician Amien Rais said the dissolution was a political way to destroy Indonesian democracy.

Indonesian legal experts criticized the decree. Margarito Kamis, a legal expert, said that a ministerial decree is not the law and the existence of the organization is not based upon that organization being registered or not. Another legal expert, Refly Harun, said the decree can be viewed as a government attack against the FPI to weaken its power, even weakening the FPI's ability to defend itself against many cases befalling it. Arif Nurul Imam, an Indo Strategic Research and Consulting political analyst, said although he appreciated the government move as the FPI always acts and tries to undermine national integrity, he feared the decision would not kill the FPI's extreme ideology and may incite the FPI to become a clandestine organization continuing to urge its former members to undermine national integrity. He added the decree may spark a polemic by legal and human rights activists.

Bivitri Susanti, called the decree "clever and difficult to challenge" but said the decree is ineffective, as it still makes it possible for former FPI members to operate under a new name, and the constitution still granted them the right to organize. However, she noted the wording of the decree made it somewhat "court-proof", as the wording of the decree declaring the ban itself did not mention the FPI being "forbidden" and "disbanded". These two words would make the decree flawed, as they could be seen as depriving the human rights of former FPI members. The decree means the FPI has lost its legal standing and any future FPI would be "acts against the law", allowing law enforcement officers to take steps according to the law.
