= Indonesian National Police headquarters shooting =

2021 gun attack in Jakarta, Indonesia

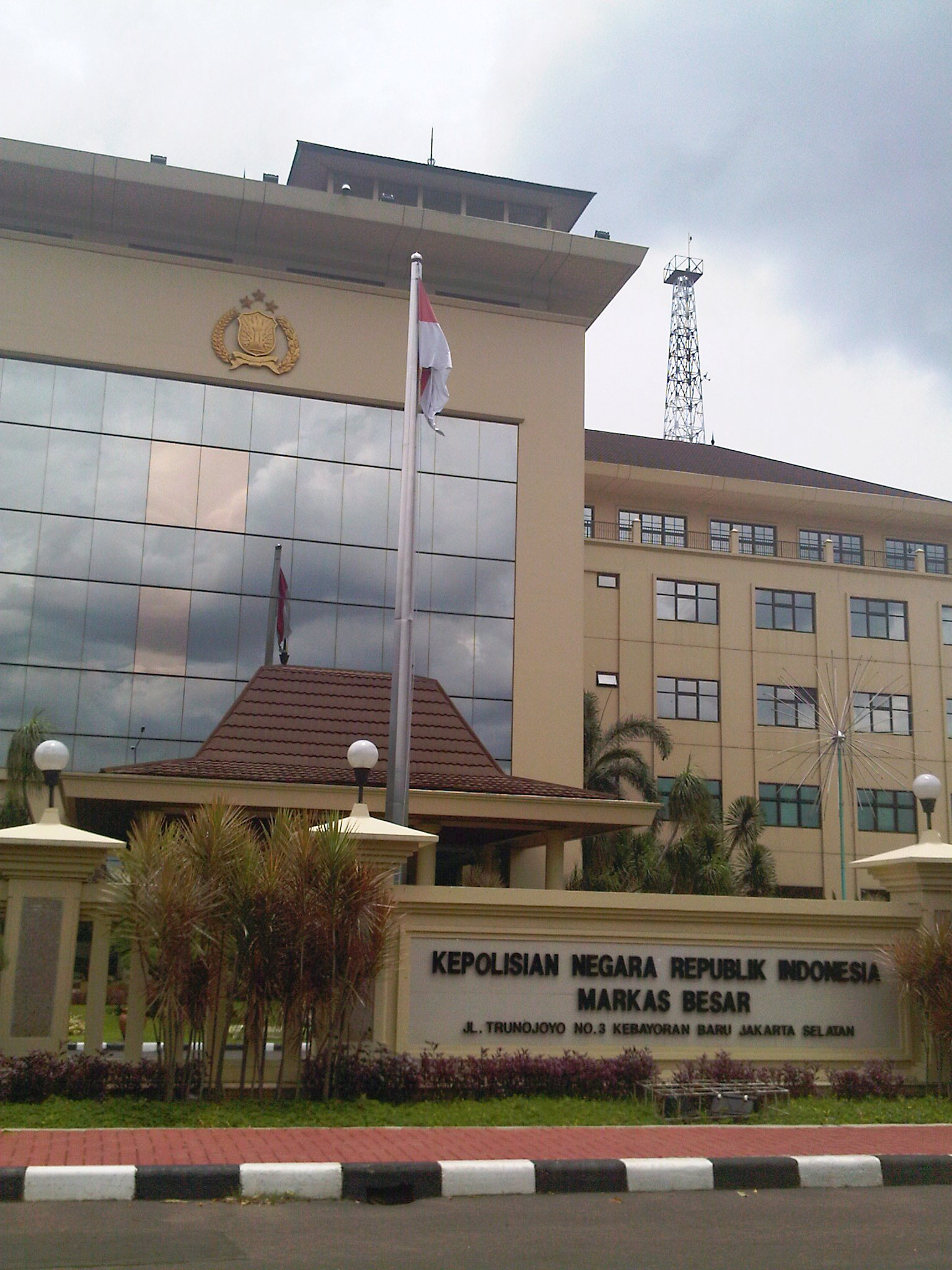
- The police HQ in 2011

- Indonesian National Police headquarters shooting (Jakarta)
- Location: 6°14′21″S 106°48′5″E; Indonesian National Police headquarters, Kebayoran Baru, South Jakarta, Jakarta, Indonesia
- Date: 31 March 2021 ±16:30 WIB (UTC+7)
- Target: Police
- Attack type: Attempted shooting and terrorist attack
- Weapon: Air pistol
- Deaths: 1 (the perpetrator)
- Injuries: None
- Perpetrator: ISIL-affiliated lone wolf
- Motive: Islamic extremism Anti-police sentiment

On 31 March 2021, at around 16:30 Western Indonesia Time (UTC+7), a shooting occurred at the Indonesian National Police headquarters in South Jakarta, Jakarta, Indonesia. A female assailant attacked police headquarters with a handgun and was shot dead after firing several rounds. The shooting happened three days after the cathedral bombing in Makassar.

== Attack ==
The attack involved two attackers who entered the premises of the police headquarters wielding handguns. The male attacker was wearing a black thawb while the female attacker was wearing a black abaya with a blue veil. The latter was shot dead as she entered the parking lot but the former was able to flee the scene. The handgun used by attacker was found to be an air gun, and was loaded with iron pellets.

== Perpetrator ==
The female attacker was identified by police as a resident of Ciracas, East Jakarta. She was a former student of a private university in Depok and dropped out around 2015. She was active at a local airsoft gun shooting club and trained to use airsoft guns but was unlicensed and untrained to shoot firearms. Moreover, she was not a member of the Indonesian Shooting and Hunting Association (Indonesian: Persatuan Menembak Sasaran dan Berburu Seluruh Indonesia) in which membership is compulsory in order to obtain a firearms license.

National Police Chief General Listyo Sigit Prabowo said the attacker was an ISIL-affiliated lone wolf. The attacker had left a statement in which she apologized to her family, stated her willingness to die as martyr for Islam, and her deep hatred and resentment of things considered un-Islamic, namely Indonesia's institutions, ideology, and political system, as well as banks, and former Jakarta governor convicted of blaspheming Islam Basuki Tjahaja Purnama. Her statement also included a short jihadist manifesto.

== Reactions ==
After the shooting, the National Police increased security in the area. Security was also increased at the Istana Negara presidential palace.

The National Police Commission, a presidential advisory body on police affairs, criticized the National Police over the attack. Its chairman, Benny Mamoto, questioned how guards at the entrance missed the concealed handgun. He also asked whether there was any policewoman present prior to the attack to search the woman before she entered.

People's Representative Council member Herman Hery (PDI-P) criticized the National Police, National Counter Terrorism Agency, and the Indonesian State Intelligence Agency. He asked them to work harder to investigate and captured anyone involved in the attack. He also urged the agencies to increase their intelligence capabilities to enable early detection.
