= Sacred Heart Cathedral, Makassar =

Coordinates: 5.1361°S 119.4100°E

Sacred Heart of Jesus Cathedral
- Katedral Hati Kudus Yesus yang Mahakudus
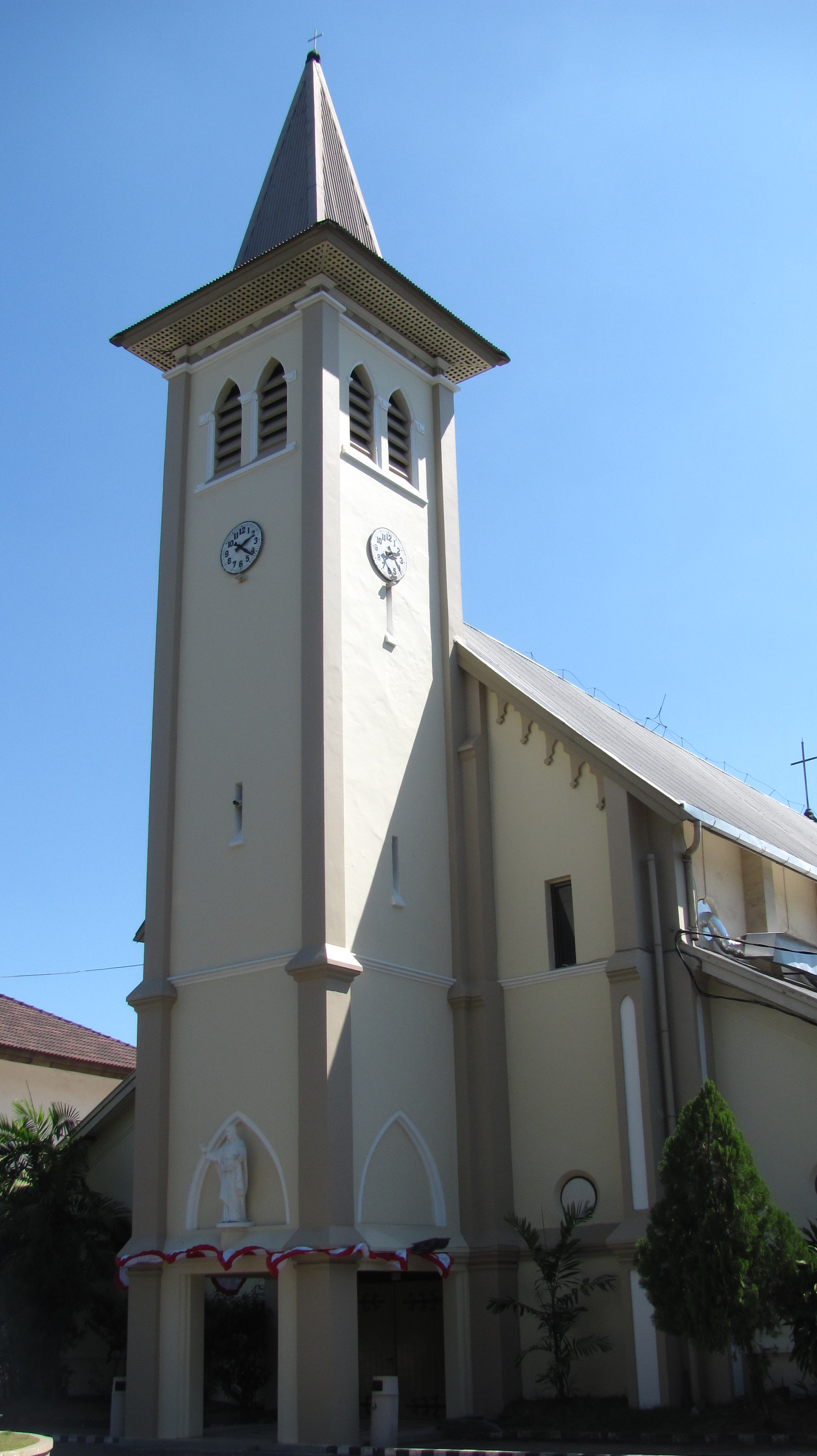
- The church as of 2015
- Sacred Heart of Jesus Cathedral
- Location: Makassar
- Country: Indonesia
- Denomination: Roman Catholic Church

Administration
- Archdiocese: Archdiocese of Makassar

The Sacred Heart of Jesus Cathedral (Indonesian: Katedral Hati Kudus Yesus yang Mahakudus) is the cathedral belonging to the Roman Catholic Archdiocese of Makassar in the city of Makassar, the capital of South Sulawesi, Indonesia.

In 1525 the city of Makassar was visited by three Portuguese missionary priests, Antonio dos Reis, Cosmas de Annunciacio and Bernardino de Marvao, accompanied by a friar. The first priest to be assigned to Makassar was the father Vicente Viegas who came from Malacca. After this implementation, several kings and nobles of Sulawesi were baptized in the Catholic Church.

The King of Gowa, Sultan Alauddin (1591–1638) granted freedom of worship to Catholics in 1633. This decision was confirmed by his successors.

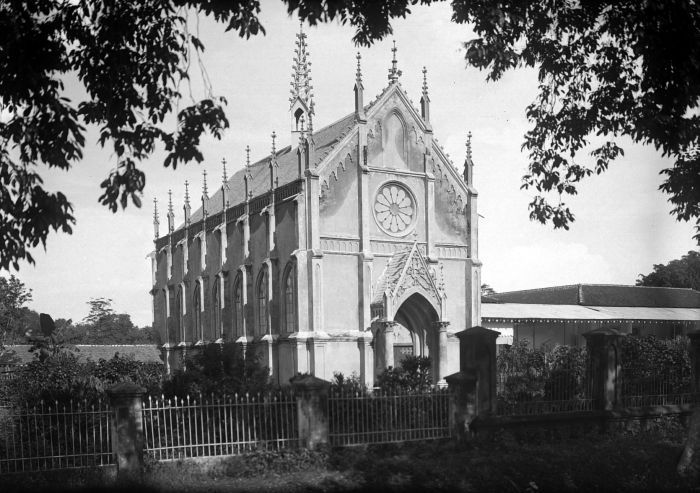
The original Cathedral with its Gothic architecture

The church construction started in 1898 and finished in 1900. It was renovated and expanded in 1939, reaching its present form in 1941.

Two suicide bombers attacked the cathedral on 28 March 2021 on Palm Sunday Mass. Twenty people were injured in the attack, and both of the bombers were killed.
