= Jelangkung (film) =

2001 Indonesian horror film

- Theatrical release poster
- Directed by: Rizal Mantovani; Jose Poernomo
- Written by: Adi Nugroho; Rizal Mantovani; Jose Poernomo
- Produced by: Jose Poernomo
- Release date: 5 October 2001
- Running time: 102 minutes
- Country: Indonesia
- Language: Indonesian
- Budget: Rp1.9 billion (US$190,000)

Jelangkung is a 2001 Indonesian horror film directed by Rizal Mantovani and Jose Poernomo. It was the only domestic feature film released that year and became a popular sensation. Originally released on a single screen, the film was later distributed to other movie theaters and was eventually seen by 1.5 million people nationwide. Jelangkung's success has been credited with reviving the genre of Indonesian horror.

== Plot ==
Jelangkung is set in the fictional Javanese village of Angkerbatu (lit. 'Haunted Rock'), which is rumoured to be haunted following the 1938 ritual killing of a twelve-year-old boy by villagers who feared he was a harbinger of disaster. In the present day, a group of teenagers who regularly explore supposedly haunted locations around Jakarta learn of the village and decide to visit it. They discover the ruins and the boy's grave, but, having encountered no ghosts, return to Jakarta disappointed.

Afterwards, the group members begin to experience hauntings. A dukun (shaman) tells them that the presence is the boy's ghost. The teenagers discover that one of them placed a jailangkung anthropomorphic totem on the boy's grave in an attempt to summon his ghost. They return to Angkerbatu to remove the totem, but the ghost resists their efforts. During a fit of hallucination, one of the teenagers kills his girlfriend. In the final scene, the ghost leaps directly towards the viewer.

== Production ==
Directors Rizal Mantovani and Jose Poernomo began their careers as music video directors. In creating Jelangkung, they combined the aesthetics and editing of music videos with Indonesian mythology. The film was originally produced as a television film for the newly-launched Trans TV network but was subsequently changed to a cinema release at the urging of journalist-turned-producer Erwin Arnada after his company Rexinema joined its production. Principal photography began in December 2000 and was completed in two weeks. Production of the film cost Rp1.9 billion (US$190,000).

== Release ==
Jelangkung was originally released on 5 October 2001 on a single screen in Pondok Indah Mall in South Jakarta. It was the first film to be screened digitally by the Cinema 21 theater chain but was later transferred to celluloid film stock for easier distribution after audiences turned out and queued for hours for tickets. It was the only domestic feature film released in 2001, an aftereffect of halted film productions and abandoned projects following the 1997 Asian financial crisis and the fall of President Suharto in 1998. The film remained in cinemas for three months. It was seen by 750,000 people in the Jakarta metropolitan area and by 1.5 million people throughout the country.

== Reception ==
Jelangkung is credited with reviving Indonesian horror, establishing new codes and conventions for the film genre. For example, every horror film made since Jelangkung has included a time gap between the original violent incident and the first appearance of the ghost. The success of Jelangkung and other domestically-produced films such as Petualangan Sherina (2000) and Ada Apa Dengan Cinta? (2002) led venture capitalists, bankers, and other businesspeople to invest in the Indonesian film industry as a way to potentially gain quick profit and media attention.
