= Jailangkung =

Indonesian folk ritual and game

Jailangkung ([dʒai'laŋkuŋ]), also called jelangkung ([dʒə'laŋkuŋ]), is an Indonesian folk ritual of communicating with spirits of the dead. It uses an effigy that a spirit is said to possess after being summoned. The practice emerged in its current form in the early 1950s and has origins in the Chinese tradition of spirit basket divination, though it also has similarities to a traditional Javanese ritual called nini towong. Jailangkung is also played as a traditional game by both children and adults, drawing criticism from medical and religious authorities. Its depiction in the 2001 film Jelangkung initiated a revival of the Indonesian horror genre.

== Practice ==
Jailangkung is a séance ritual of communicating with spirits of the dead, who are summoned using simple mantras. The term also describes the straw effigy that a spirit is said to possess when communicating with the audience. The body of the effigy is made from a basket and is draped with a shirt. A male spirit is also called jailangkung, while a female one is called jailangse. During the ritual, a writing slate and chalk are provided for the spirit to communicate with the audience. Food and tea may be presented to encourage the spirit to write and communicate. Alternative methods ask the effigy or another possessed object to point at letters of the alphabet written on pieces of paper or to knock on the table.

The ritual is also played as a game by both children and adults, summoning the spirits to ask comical questions. It is a popular nocturnal pastime among Javanese high school and university students. Jailangkung gatherings have sometimes resulted in participants developing serious behavioral problems and are regularly denounced by medical and religious (Christian and Muslim) authorities.

== Origins ==
Jailangkung originates from the Chinese practice of spirit basket divination. Although this practice dates to the fifth century, it had disappeared in the Chinese diaspora by the 1950s. Its etymology is the Chinese term meaning "vegetable basket deity" (菜籃公; Càilángōng). An 1854 account by European observers in Ningbo, published in Chambers's Edinburgh Journal, described the divination practice as "an epidemic: there was scarcely a house in which it was not practiced for a season almost daily". Jailangkung re-emerged among Indonesia's urban communities and became infamous in its current form in the early 1950s. Singaporean anthropologist Margaret Chan noted that all of her Indonesian informants knew of the practice. Indonesian writer Hersri Setiawan, who was once a political prisoner of the New Order government in the 1970s, recalled that inmates often passed their time by playing jailangkung.

Setiawan observed that jailangkung is similar to the Javanese traditional animistic ritual called nini towong or nini towok, which also became a theatrical game played during the full moon by village children. In the Javanese tradition, the spirits were always female, appearing as a grandmother figure. When jailangkung re-appeared as a practice, it adopted the Chinese tradition of recognizing both male and female spirits. He hypothesized that the presence of a dominant male spirit was more relatable to the Javanese concepts of ruler and subject. Chan theorized that the male Chinese jailangkung was introduced into Indonesia's urban centers by nineteenth-century Chinese immigrants, whereas the female Javanese nini towong is derived from the Chinese goddess Zigu that is invoked in the spirit basket divinations, introduced to Indonesia at an earlier time.

== In popular culture ==
Jailangkung has been featured in horror films. It was the subject of the 2001 low-budget film Jelangkung by Rizal Mantovani and Jose Poernomo. The film was a box office sensation seen by over 1.5 million people and revived the Indonesian horror film genre, establishing new conventions for future horror films. It became highest-grossing film in Indonesian history at the time.

== See also ==
- Fuji (planchette writing)
- Indonesian horror
- Kokkuri
- Ouija
