= Islamic Defenders Front =

Banned Indonesian hardline Islamist organization

Islamic Defenders Front الجبهة الدفاعية الإسلامية
- Front Pembela Islam
- Logo of the Islamic Defenders Front
- Abbreviation: FPI
- Successor: Islamic Brotherhood Front (unrecognized)/Illegal
- Formation: 17 August 1998; 28 years ago
- Founder: Muhammad Rizieq Shihab
- Founded at: Ciputat, South Tangerang, Banten
- Dissolved: 21 June 2019; 7 years ago, (De jure); 30 December 2020; 5 years ago (De facto)
- Type: Mass organization
- Legal status: Banned
- Purpose: Politic, social, economic and culture
- Headquarters: Petamburan, Tanah Abang, Jakarta
- Coordinates: 6.193923°S 106.805825°E
- Region served: Indonesia (especially in Jakarta, West Java, Banten, Lampung and Central Java)
- Members: 2014
- Official language: Arabic, Indonesian
- Grand Imam: Muhammad Rizieq Shihab
- Chairman: Ahmad Shabri Lubis
- Secretary-general: Munarman
- Affiliations: Sunni Islam (Islamic conservatism)

The Islamic Defenders Front (Indonesian: Front Pembela Islam; abbr. FPI) was an Indonesian hardline Islamist organization founded in 1998 by Muhammad Rizieq Shihab with backing from military and political figures. Since 2015, Ahmad Shabri Lubis has been the organization's leader, while Rizieq Shihab holds the title of Grand Imam (Indonesian: Imam Besar) of the FPI for life. The FPI originally positioned itself as an Islamic religious police, mostly by conducting illegal and unauthorized vigilante operations. It also acted as an Islamist pressure group with prominent social media activism and mass mobilizations against pro-government activists, ethnic Chinese, Christian minority, as well as liberal and reformist politicians.

The organization staged a number of religious and political mass protests, including the November 2016 Jakarta protests and other rallies against the then-Jakarta governor Basuki Tjahaja Purnama. The FPI also rallied outside the American Embassy in Jakarta in 2003 in order to condemn the Iraq War. The protesters were accused of committing hate crimes in the name of Islam and religious-related violence.

On 30 December 2020, the Indonesian government issued a joint ministerial decree in which it banned the FPI, for engaging in terrorist and criminal acts and disturbing public order. The Indonesian government said that the FPI had threatened Indonesia's national ideology, committed illegal raids and atrocities including terrorism, and its organizational permit had expired. The government also showed footage of Rizieq Shihab pledging the FPI's allegiance to the Islamic State (ISIL/ISIS) and advocating the establishment of a caliphate. The disbandment came a few weeks after six FPI members were shot dead by police.

== History ==
FPI emerged on 17 August 1998 as an outcome of the meeting by religious leaders to commemorate the 53rd anniversary of Indonesian independence. The gathering took place at the pesantren (Islamic boarding school) of al-Umm in Ciputat, South Tangerang. It was hosted by Misbahul Anam, an activist of the Indonesian Islam Boyscouts (PII), and attended by religious leaders affiliated with haba'ib (scholars from the descendants of the Islamic prophet Muhammad), notably Muhammad Rizieq Shihab.

The meeting discussed urgent issues faced by the Muslim community, namely the proliferation of maksiat (immorality), killings of Muslims in places such as Tanjung Priok and Aceh, and the lack of Muslim organizations that can impose the Islamic doctrine of amr ma'ruf nahy munkar (enjoining good and forbidding wrong).

The first major FPI campaign that garnered media attention was an incident in Ketapang, Central Jakarta in November 1998. The incident was triggered by the killing of a local Betawi Muslim teenager by Ambonese Christian, and rapidly escalated into a Muslim-Christian riot which claimed dozens of lives (see Maluku sectarian conflict). The Betawi community called the support of FPI, which made an effort to prevent further escalation.

The organization aims to implement sharia law in Indonesia. Later, it transformed itself into an Islamist pressure group which furthers its political motives by promoting what is considered as religious or racial propaganda through the Internet and occasional anti-government campaigns. However, in January 2017, several FPI official Twitter accounts were suspended due to violations of Twitter rules, including spamming, incivility and making threats.

=== Government support ===
The emergence of FPI attracted strong interest among the high-rank members of the Indonesian military. The Indonesian military, which previously suppressed political Islam during the New Order era, had been approaching conservative Islamic groups since Feisal Tanjung was inaugurated as the commander in 1993, to disguise the military's continued role controlling the people in the face of criticism from the more moderate to left-wing segments of Indonesian society, including the some 3000 non-governmental organizations working there.

The military provided monetary aid as well as military training to the paramilitary wing of FPI known as Laskar Pembela Islam (Islamic Defenders Paramilitary, LPI). In turn, FPI occasionally mobilized action in support of the former commander Wiranto and several army generals. FPI also received patronage from the chief of Jakarta police Nugroho Djayusman. B.J. Habibie, who eventually succeeded the presidency after Suharto, also provided funding toward several Islamic groups including FPI in anticipation of his election. Even after the transition to democracy, a number of military generals, loath to relinquish their power after so many decades of dictatorship, continued their support of FPI, who provided a believable curtain of grassroots support for paramilitary muscle in the still-turbulent social order.

=== Loss of government support ===
FPI lost major support from the state apparatus after the inauguration of Sofyan Yacob as the chief of Jakarta police, who criticised FPI's vigilantism. FPI's headquarters in Petamburan, Tanah Abang was raided by police in 2002 and 13 members were arrested following FPI's attack on nightclubs and billiard halls. Rizieq was also arrested in 2003 and jailed for seven months. Misbahul Anam, the former secretary-general of FPI, considered the relations with the state apparatus to be opportunistic. However, Sutanto, the chief of the national police (2005–2008) and state intelligent agency (2009–2011), maintained the importance of utilizing FPI in certain cases. Even after 2002, FPI acted in cooperation with military and police on several occasions, including in 2010 and 2011 to shut down public debates held by LGBT and Ahmadiyya activists.

In November 2020, the Home Affairs Ministry said FPI had lost its legal status as a civil organization because its registration certificate had expired on 20 June 2019. The ministry said FPI therefore should not have conducted activities as a civil organization. FPI spokesman Munarman countered that organizations do not require a registration certificate for legal status, as freedom to assembly is enshrined in the Indonesian Constitution.

=== Political support ===
FPI also found political support among the politicians who belong to the Islamist, conservative, and right-wing nationalist political parties. Hamzah Haz of the United Development Party and the 9th vice president of Indonesia (2001–2004) occasionally visited FPI meetings during his terms. FPI provided grassroots support for Wiranto during the 2004 and 2009 presidential election, as well as former army general Prabowo Subianto during the 2014 and 2019 presidential election. FPI's notable political allies include the Prosperous Justice Party (PKS) and the National Mandate Party (PAN), both being conservative Islamic parties, as well as the recently disbanded Hizbut Tahrir Indonesia (HTI). It also allegedly maintained close relations to the family of former president Suharto, most notably Tommy Suharto as evidenced by their meeting in 2017 during the commemoration of Supersemar.

=== December 2020 shootings ===
Early on 7 December 2020, police shot dead six members of FPI in two different circumstances. Two were killed in a shootout on Jakarta-Cikampek Toll Road and four were later shot while in police custody. Police said the six were among 10 FPI members who had crashed into a police car and attacked officers at the kilometre 50 point of the toll road. FPI said the six were Rizieq's personal bodyguards and had been abducted by thugs. Amnesty International Indonesia said "police must be open and transparent about the incident and what led to the use of firearms against the supporters of FPI leader Muhammad Rizieq Shihab. The incident should be independently investigated and if the police officers violated international standards regarding the use of force and firearms, they should be brought to justices."

The six victims of the shooting were identified as:

- Andi Oktiawan (33 years old)
- Ahmad Sofiyana (26)
- Lutfi Hakim (25)
- Faiz Ahmad Syukur (22)
- Muhammad Suci Khadavi (21)
- Muhammad Reza (20)

Responding to the killings, President Joko Widodo said the police "are protected by law" in doing their work and warned that citizens should not break the law or harm the country. FPI Secretary General Munarman criticised the president's response as justification of deadly human rights abuse.

On 8 January 2021, the National Commission on Human Rights (Komnas HAM) announced the preliminary results of its investigation into the killings. Komnas HAM said two of the FPI members were killed in a shootout with police, and the four others were later killed in police custody. It described the killings as a human rights violation and called for the prosecution of the perpetrators.

On 3 March 2021, police said the six slain FPI members would be charged posthumously with assault of police officers. Police later said three personnel from Jakarta Police were being investigated over allegations they had acted unlawfully during the incident. On 25 March 2021, police said one of three officers incriminated in the killings had since died in an accident. On 18 March 2022, South Jakarta District Court found the two surviving police officers guilty of the unlawful killing of four FPI members, but ruled they could not be punished because the shootings were "justified" as the officers had acted in self-defense.

=== Disbandment ===
The Indonesian government on 30 December 2020 disbanded FPI for engaging in terrorist and criminal acts and disturbing public order. The disbandment was announced by Coordinating Minister for Political, Legal, and Security Affairs Mahfud MD. He said the ban was signed by six ministerial-level state officials: the Home Affairs Minister, Communications and Information Minister, Justice and Human Rights Minister, National Counterterrorism Agency chief, National Police chief, and the Attorney General. The announcement was also attended by the National Armed Forces Commander, the Presidential Chief of Staff, and other senior government officials. The Indonesian National Police said 199 FPI members were involved in 94 criminal cases, and 35 members of FPI have alleged links to terrorist groups.

The ban categorized FPI as a "forbidden organization", giving law enforcement officials the right to disperse its organizational activities or gatherings. The ban came after police earlier in December 2020 shot dead six FPI members. FPI initially said it would appeal the disbandment but later decided to not appeal, saying "the decree is the refuse of the civilization, and the refuse is better put on the septic tank."

=== Reincarnations ===
Subsequently after FPI dissolved by the Indonesian government, several reincarnations were declared, all of them are under the abbreviation "FPI", same as their predecessors.

After the disbandment, former FPI secretary general Munarman and other senior FPI figures announced that FPI would be replaced by Front Persatuan Islam (English: Islamic Unity Front). They vowed to continue to fight against the government, which they described as a "tyrannical regime" and said "its decisions carry little to no merit". Munarman said the "Front Persatuan Islam" name must be adopted by all FPI members, administrators and sympathizers, rather than using the name Front Pembela Islam.

The Islamic Unity Front declared it would never register with the government. Demak branch of FPI and the East Kalimantan branch of FPI declared their willingness to be part of the renamed organization. The Indonesian National Police threatened to dissolve the new FPI. The Islamic Unity Front then changed its name to the Islamic Brotherhood Front (Front Persaudaraan Islam).

==== Islamic Brotherhood Front ====
Current logo of Islamic Brotherhood Front, launched on 17 August 2021.

On 17 August 2021, in conjunction with Indonesian Independence Day, the Islamic Brotherhood Front launched its new logo. On 5 September, a group of unmasked people declared the foundation of the West Java branch of Islamic Brotherhood Front, at Daarul Khoirot Mosque, West Bandung Regency. Head of the West Bandung branch of Nation and Political Unity Body (Kesbangpol), Suryaman stated that they minimally detected the foundation of the new FPI. The head of Centre of Youth and Population Research (CYPR), Dedek Prayudi reacted to the declaration of Islamic Brotherhood Front: "One should see first the AD/ART of Islamic Brotherhood Front. If it is still similar to FPI, (this organization) should be dissolved". As a response, the regent of West Bandung, Hengky Kurniawan, declared that he together with the Municipal Police would rebuke the declaration as it outlaws health protocols.

On 7 September, the former Banten province branch leader (imam) of the "old" FPI, Ahmad Qurthubi Jaelani was chosen as the new chairman of the Islamic Brotherhood Front through consensus by branch leaders and advisors. Officially according to the vice chairman of Islamic Brotherhood Front, Syahid Joban said that the new FPI was different from the old FPI; with the new FPI more focused on human rights and education. As of September 2021, Rizieq Shihab and Munarman currently do not appear in positions of the new FPI, but the advocate team of FPI, Aziz Yanuar said that both will be placed in honorable position.

Instead of becoming hostile as its predecessors, the Islamic Brotherhood Front tends to be peaceful with other organizations, especially with the Nahdlatul Ulama's militia body Banser working together to help victims of 2021 Semeru eruption. The son-in-law of Muhammad Rizieq Shihab, Habib Muhammad bin Husein Alatas was elected as the chairman of the Islamic Brotherhood Front, via the first national conference held by the new FPI at Lebak Regency, Banten from 16 to 17 March 2022.

==== Others ====
The Ciamis branch of FPI declared via Twitter it renamed the group as Front Pejuang Islam (Islamic Fighters Front). The Ciamis branch also declared it was adopting the new name of Front Perjuangan Islam (Islamic Struggle Front). Wawan Malik Marwan, founder of both the Islamic Fighters Front and Islamic Struggle Front said if the organizations were banned, he would form an organization named Front Pencinta Islam (Islam Lovers Front).

==== Alleged involvement in 2021 Makassar cathedral bombing ====
Ex-members of the organizations are allegedly involved in the bombing of a cathedral in Makassar. Some attributes of Islamic Defenders Front were found in house of suspected terrorist. Nearly one month after the bombing, on 27 April 2021, former Islamic Defenders Front General Secretary and Muhammad Rizieq Shihab's close confidante, Munarman, was arrested. He was arrested because he possessed the knowledge about the terrorist network, but chose to hide it. Not only that he also involved in inciting people to commit terrorism and conspiring with terrorists against the state. He also charged by police to be involved with "bay'ah" of terrorists' group and their pledge of allegiance to ISIL in Makassar, Jakarta, and Medan terror networks.

== Views and activities ==
=== Opposition against pluralism ===
The FPI is a staunch opponent of liberalism and multiculturalism, and to the extension of the Pancasila doctrine which upholds religious pluralism. On 1 June 2008, the FPI staged an attack against members of the National Alliance for the Freedom of Faith and Religion (AKKBB), who were holding a rally coinciding with the commemoration day of Pancasila near the National Monument in the city center. The attack was claimed as a response to the perceived threat by the AKKBB against the FPI. The incident was referred to by the media as the Monas incident. It caused media outrage and led to the arrest of Rizieq Shihab among 56 other FPI members. Rizieq was later imprisoned for one year and six months, after being convicted over attacks against the AKKBB. In January 2017, the police declared FPI leader Rizieq Shihab a suspect for alleged defamation of Pancasila .

The FPI also often holds protests against what it sees as the spread of Christianity of Indonesia. Notable targets include GKI Yasmin of Bogor, and HKBP Church of Bekasi, where the group used violence to force the closure of the churches. The FPI also endorsed the Singkil administration for closing around 20 churches in Singkil, Aceh. This stirred up controversy over the use of the local administrative law in accordance with Sharia, running counter to the Indonesian constitution, which guarantees freedom of religious practice. In early 2017, the FPI and related Islamist groups staged a mass protest against a newly built church in Bekasi, West Java. The protest developed into a riot and scuffles with the police, resulting in property damage and five police officers being injured.

Like many other Islamist groups in Indonesia, the FPI holds a negative sentiment toward ethnic Chinese people, often to the point of spreading hate speech, racist remarks and threats of lynching against them. FPI members and sympathizers regularly accused the ethnic Chinese of being "illegal immigrants", often with false narratives claiming that the Chinese are communists and "enemies of Islam", despite a significant number of Chinese Indonesian Muslims.

=== Ahmadiyyah persecution ===
The FPI was suspected of acting behind the scenes in the 6 February 2011 assault against the Ahmadiyyah community, in which three people were killed. The assault was led by a group of over thousand people, wielding rocks, machetes, swords, and spears. They attacked the house of an Ahmadi leader in Cikeusik, Banten. Similarly, a group attacked the Ahmadiyyah headquarters near Bogor and harassed its members in areas such as in East Lombok, Manislor, Tasikmalaya, Parung, and Garut.

=== Actions against perceived communist threat ===
The FPI, like many conservative politicians in Indonesia, often employs anti-communist rhetoric as a political motivation. In June 2010, along with other organizations, the FPI attacked a meeting about free healthcare in East Java, mistaking it for a "meeting" of the banned Communist Party of Indonesia. In January 2017, the FPI called for the withdrawal of Rupiah banknotes, and accused it of allegedly displaying the image of the banned hammer and sickle logo. The FPI's allegations, however, were rejected by Bank Indonesia (BI), referring to it as a recto-verso security feature of the Bank Indonesia logo for the new Rupiah banknotes. FPI was accused of stirring public unrest by slandering Bank Indonesia and the government. FPI frequently denounced liberal and centrist political parties (such as PDI-P or Golkar), accusing them as being "pro-communist" and "Islamophobic".

It is widely believed that the Islamist anti-communist rhetoric is the reason behind the showing of docudrama film Pengkhianatan G30S/PKI on some Indonesian national televisions beginning in 2017, 20 years after it was once a mandatory viewing material by the New Order government.

=== Anti-governmental campaigns ===
The FPI was known for its outspoken views against the Indonesian government since the presidency of Abdurrahman Wahid, and alongside other related Islamist groups, had repeatedly threatened to topple the government. This campaign notably intensified under Joko Widodo's presidency, especially following former Jakarta governor Basuki Tjahaja Purnama's alleged blasphemy incident in 2016.

=== Activities against perceived defamation of Islamic sensitivity ===
The FPI is notably sensitive toward the perceived defamation and violation of Islamic norms in various aspects of society. In its early days, FPI targeted shops and vendors that are open or sells alcohol during the month of Ramadan, most of which were reportedly forced to close down or ransacked. Various nightclubs, bars, and cafes were targeted by the FPI for perceived non-conformity with Islamic norms. In 2006, the FPI and other Islamic organizations including the Indonesian Mujahedeen Council protested against the publication of Playboy Indonesia. The protest led to the eviction of the Playboy office from Jakarta to Bali. In 2013, the FPI accused LGBT activists, such as Lady Gaga and Irshad Manji, of being "devils", and threatened their safety. This erupted in controversy in 2012 during Lady Gaga's Born This Way tour, which resulted in the eventual cancellation of concerts in Indonesia. The action was criticised for being a violation of Indonesian law sanctioning violent threats, as prescribed in Article 336 of the Criminal Code.

In 2015, the FPI attacked politician and Purwakarta regent Dedi Mulyadi, accusing him of being a musyrik (polytheist) after he put up statues of Sundanese puppets in a number of city parks throughout Purwakarta in West Java. the FPI accused Dedi of debasing Islamic tenets by violating the aniconist principle of Islam, as well as using the Sundanese greeting Sampurasun, instead of the Muslim-approved Assalamualaikum. In December 2015, around a hundred FPI members conducted a 'sweeping' operation against Mulyadi himself. Its members inspected cars passing through the front gate of Taman Ismail Marzuki (TIM) in Central Jakarta where the Indonesia Theater Federation Awards ceremony was being held, attempting to stop Mulyadi from attending the event.

=== Opposition against Basuki Tjahaja Purnama ===
The FPI gained renewed notoriety for its efforts to topple the administration of former Jakarta governor Basuki "Ahok" Tjahaja Purnama. The FPI criticised Basuki's background as a Christian and Chinese Indonesian, both being minorities, citing that the position of the governor of Jakarta should be reserved only for Muslims. In 2014, the FPI held a demonstration in front of the Jakarta Regional People's Representative Council building in Jakarta. The organization refused to accept Basuki as Jakarta's governor after former governor Joko Widodo was elected President the same year.

In late 2016, during the 2017 Jakarta gubernatorial election season, the FPI led the national outcry against Basuki for his alleged blasphemy against the Qur'an. As a response to the perceived blasphemy, the FPI organized seven protests titled 'Aksi Bela Islam', ('Action to Defend Islam') in order to create pressure against Basuki and to demand his imprisonment. The protests culminated in the November 2016 Jakarta protests, December 2016 Jakarta protests and February 2017 Jakarta protests. These were held once a month until Basuki's final conviction in May 2017, when he was sentenced to two years imprisonment after losing the election to Anies Baswedan.

=== Mass gatherings after return of Rizieq Shihab ===
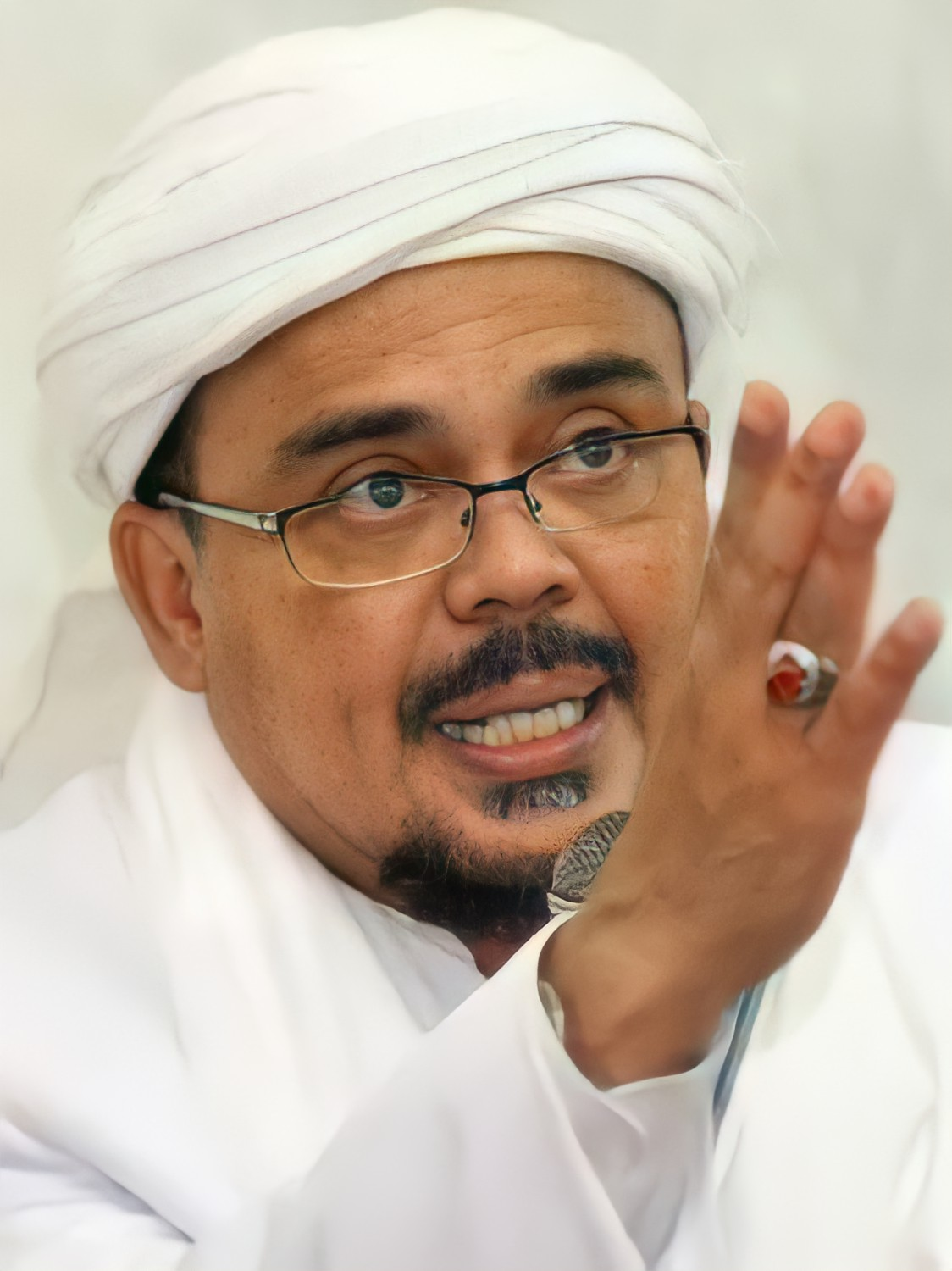
Undated photograph of Habib Muhammad Rizieq Shihab, founder of the Islamic Defenders Front

FPI was involved in controversial actions after Rizieq Shihab returned to Indonesia from Saudi Arabia on 10 November 2020. FPI members were among thousands of Rizieq's supporters who greeted him on arrival at Soekarno-Hatta International Airport. Ignoring government regulations on COVID-19 pandemic restrictions, FPI members attended a mass gathering at Rizieq's home in Jakarta's Petamburan neighborhood. On 13 November, FPI members gathered in large numbers with Rizieq in Megamendung, Bogor. West Java Governor Ridwan Kamil blamed Security Minister Mahfud MD for allowing the mass gatherings.

== Reception ==
=== General public ===
There have been demands by Indonesians, mainly mainstream Muslims, other religious organizations, political communities and ethnic groups, for the FPI to be disbanded or banned. Ansor Youth Movement, the youth branch of Nahdlatul Ulama, the biggest Muslim organization in Indonesia, demanded the government to shut down FPI in 2008, but the government never agreed to such calls. Various critics and media outlets have described the FPI as inciting extremism, racism and bigotry, particularly noting its occasional hate crimes, discrimination against minorities and religious intolerance. An International Crisis Group report called it "an urban thug organization", emphasizing its violent vigilantism. The group has also been criticised for the use of violence; the police have recorded that the FPI engaged in 29 cases of violence and destructive behavior in 2010 and 5 cases in 2011 in West Java, Banten, Central Java, North Sumatra and South Sumatra. A survey conducted by SMRC in November 2020 shown that 43% of Indonesians view FPI favorably, while 57% view them unfavorably. Similar survey conducted in 2019 shown that FPI is viewed favorably by only 33% of Indonesians.

The FPI is considered as a terrorist organization by the Terrorism Research & Analysis Consortium. (TRAC)

=== Rejection in Kalimantan ===
On 11 February 2012, hundreds of protesters from Palangkaraya, Central Kalimantan; mainly from the Dayak tribe; staged a protest at Tjilik Riwut Airport to block the arrival of four senior leaders of the group, who wanted to inaugurate the provincial branch of the organization. Due to security concerns, the management of the airport ordered the FPI members to remain on board the aircraft while other passengers disembarked. The FPI members were then flown to Banjarmasin in South Kalimantan. The deputy chairman of the Central Kalimantan Dayak Tribe Council (DAD) later said that the organization had asked the Central Kalimantan Police to ban the group's provincial chapter as the FPI's presence would create tension, particularly as Central Kalimantan is known as a place conducive to religious harmony. A formal letter from the Central Kalimantan administration stated that they firmly rejected the FPI and would not let them establish a chapter in the province because it "contradicts the local wisdom of the Dayak tribe that upholds peace". The letter was sent to the Minister of Coordination of Political, Legal and Security Affairs with copies being sent to the president of Indonesia, the People's Consultative Assembly speaker, the Chief Justice of the Constitutional Court, the Home Minister and the National Police Chief. The FPI is now banned all over Kalimantan for its disruptive and divisive actions against local communities.

== Organization ==
FPI broadly consists of two parts, the Consultative Assembly which aims to provide decision-making, and the Executive Board which carries out the decision provided by the Consultative Assembly. FPI's paramilitary division known as Laskar Pembela Islam (LPI), which conducts all the vigilantism, is attached to the Department of Jihad and State Defense of the Executive Board. LPI is structured in a very similar manner with an actual military; led by Imam Besar (Grand Imam), there are multiple ranks based on the number of military personnel commanded by them, from Imam (25,000 personnel), Wali (5,000 personnel), Qaid (1,000 personnel), Amir (200 personnel), to Rais (20 personnel). Each one of the LPI personnel is referred to as Jundi.

FPI is an organization open for the public, and anybody can be a member. This allowed FPI to expand quickly since its foundation in 1998, and it can rapidly mobilize personnel during the demonstrations. FPI has its branch on a provincial level with similar organizational structures consist of advisory and executive boards. Although the networks penetrate into district and sub-district levels, they are loosely coordinated, and often there are cases of fragmentation such as FPI Surakarta branch which claims to be independent of the headquarters in Jakarta.

=== Organizational structure ===
- Majelis Tanfidzi (Executive Board)
  - Chief Leader: Ahmad Shabri Lubis
    - Department of Foreign Affairs
    - Department of Home Affairs
    - Department of Religious Affairs
    - Department of Jihad and State Defense
      - Laskar Pembela Islam (Islamic Defenders Paramilitary, LPI)
    - Department of Social, Political, and Legal Affairs
    - Department of Education and Culture
    - Department of Economy and Industry
    - Department of Research and Technology
    - Department of Logistics
    - Department of Social Welfare
    - Department of Information
    - Department of Women's Affairs
  - Secretary-General: Munarman
    - Commission of Front Experts
    - Commission of Front Recruitment
    - Commission of Front Investigation
    - Commission of Front Legal Assistance
    - Anti-Maksiat Commission
    - Anti-Violence Commission
- Majelis Syuro (Consultative Assembly)
  - Chief Leader: Muhsin bin Ahmad Al-Attas
    - Commission of Sharia
    - Commission of Honor
    - Commission of Coordination
    - Commission of Consultancy
    - Commission of Supervision
