= Monas incident =

The Monas incident was an incident in Merdeka Square in Jakarta in Indonesia on 1 June 2008.

It occurred at the National Monument (Monas) in an attack against a public protest by the activist group National Alliance for the Freedom of Faith and Religion (AKKBB) that coincided with the anniversary of Pancasila.

The incident began when AKKBB held the demonstration near the National Monument, Jakarta, and later the AKKBB aggregate was attacked by the group of Islamic Defenders Front (FPI) members. FPI masses beat the AKKBB protesters in various ways, including damaging of loudspeakers and burning of banners. 14 persons were reported injured and nine were taken to hospital. The demonstration that had been coordinated with the police presence was then disbanded, thus some people fled to the National Gallery while inviting journalists to come to the rescue. The head of the public relations department of police headquarters, the Inspector General Abubakar Nataprawira denied the police had made any negligence on the escort of the demonstrators.

== Reaction ==
Munarman, the head of Laskar Islam, stated that the attack was carried out due to the demonstration being the activism led by the Ahmadiyyah advocacy group, and unrelated with the commemoration of Pancasila doctrine. Munarman also corrected the media reports involving FPI members as the perpetrator and stated that the attack was carried out by the Laskar Islam Commando. The chairman of the Muslim Forum, Mashadi, also showed a video claimed to be a provocation on the account of AKKBB against the FPI members, which triggered the violence. The video contains a picture of a participant allegedly threatening FPI with the issuance of a weapon, but not in a clear form.

== Impact ==
The acts by the FPI members have resulted in some of the facilities at the National Monument being heavily damaged. This was conveyed by the Governor of Jakarta, Fauzi Bowo, subsequently stating that there will be consequences for any act of violation. Later, the governor asked the police department to investigate who the perpetrators of the vandalism were. The incident was followed up by the deployment of 1,500 police officers at the FPI headquarters at Tanah Abang, Central Jakarta on June 4, 2008, and the arrest of 57 FPI members. Among the arrested was the FPI leader Muhammad Rizieq Shihab. Later Munarman has been also designated on the watch list by the police for escaping, and his whereabouts were unknown. The Monas incident had also sparked protests against the use of violence.
