= Moch Aldy MA =

Indonesian poet (born 2000)

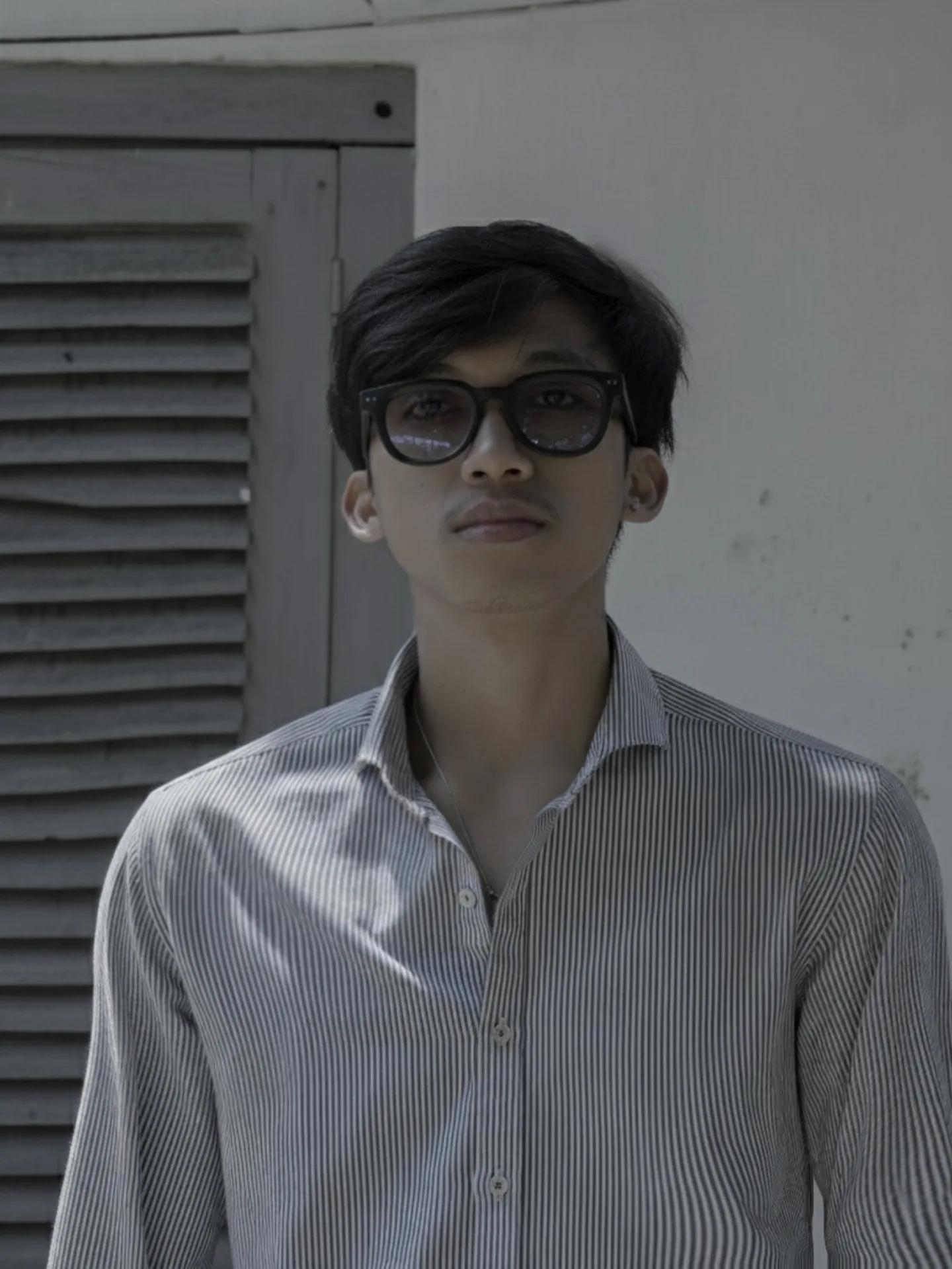
- Moch Aldy MA pada 2025
- Born: Mochammad Aldy Maulana Adha; March 27, 2000 (age 26); Bogor Regency, West Java, Indonesia
- Occupations: poet; writer; editor; filmmaker
- Years active: 2021–present

Moch Aldy MA (born 27 March 2000), also known as Mochammad Aldy Maulana Adha, is an Indonesian poet, writer, editor, and filmmaker. His poems have appeared in Indonesian literary and media publications, including Media Indonesia, Koran Tempo, Kompas.id, Bacapetra, Basabasi, and Borobudur Writers.

In 2025, Aldy was selected as an Indonesian representative for the poetry writing program of the Majelis Sastra Asia Tenggara (MASTERA).

== Literary work ==
Aldy's poetry has been published in a number of Indonesian literary publications. Scientia Indonesia published a selection of his poems accompanied by commentary by writer Ragdi F. Daye in 2022.

His work has also appeared in Tempo, including a poem concerning Hong Kong and Swedish film directors. Another poem, Andrei Tarkovsky, was published by Kalam Sastra in its Dwimingguan 44 edition.

Additional poems by Aldy have been published by Bacapetra, Basabasi, Borobudur Writers, and Jernih.

In 2024, Halimun Salaka published a profile of Aldy that discussed his poetry and creative process.

== Editing ==
Aldy has worked as a literary editor. According to Liris, he has served as a fiction editor at Omong-Omong Media and as a book editor at OM Institute.

He has also served as a judge in a short-story competition held as part of the Festival of Arts & Sports at the University of Indonesia.

== Film ==
In 2025, Aldy directed the short film Mulih Ka Jati, Mulang Ka Asal, which represented Cigombong District at the Festival Film Kabupaten Bogor.
