= Rizieq Shihab =

Indonesian Islamist scholar (born 1965)

Habib Rizieq Shihab
- مُحَمَّد رِزْق شِهَاب
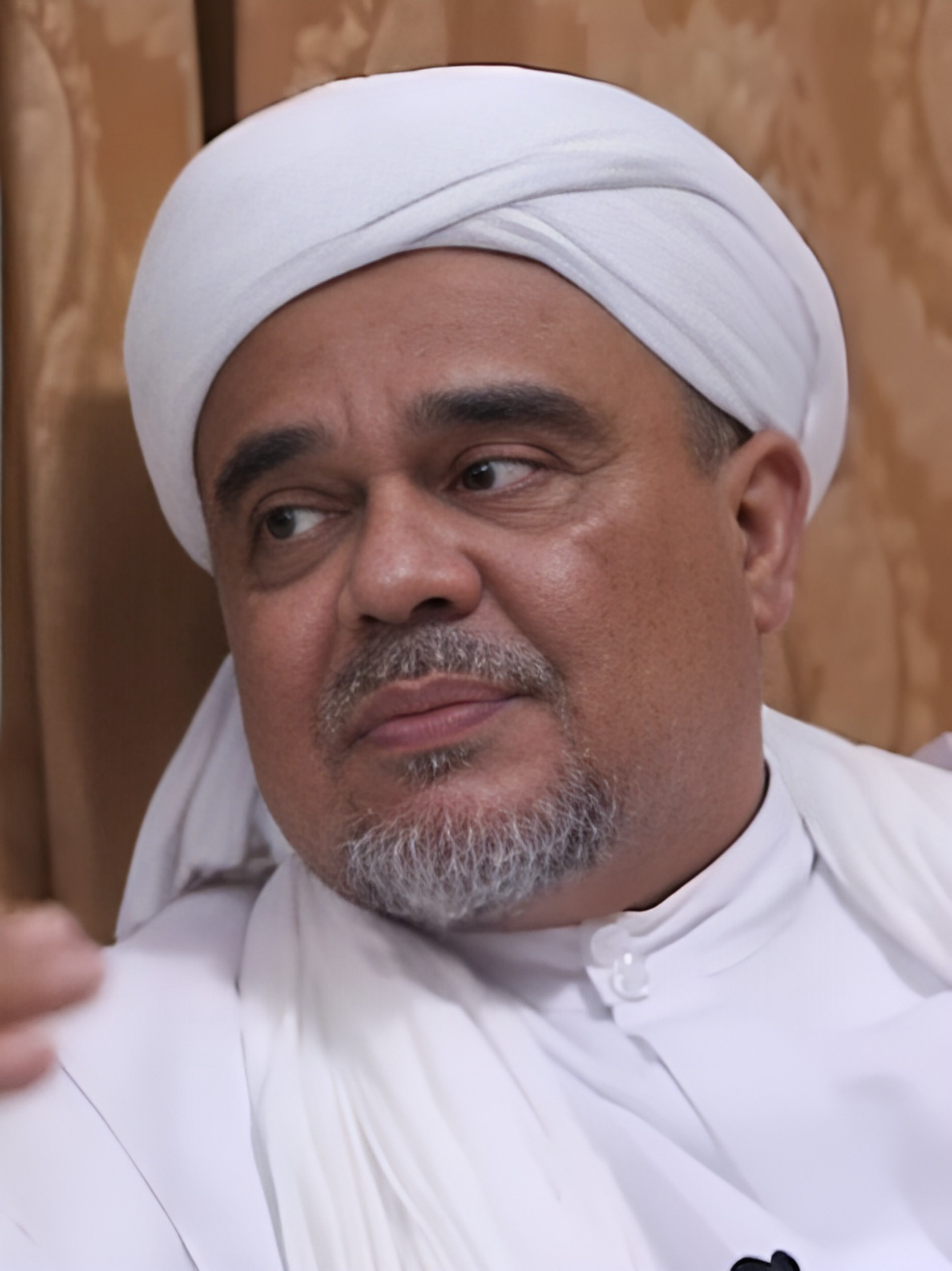
- Rizieq in 2022
- Born: 24 August 1965 (age 61); Jakarta, Indonesia
- Education: King Saud University; International Islamic University Malaysia; Universiti Sains Islam Malaysia
- Occupation: Cleric
- Years active: 1998‒2020
- Known for: FPI
- Spouse(s): Fadlun Yahya (deceased); Mona Hasina Alaydrus
- Children: 7
- Parents: Hussein Shihab (father); Sidah Alatas (mother)

Habib Muhammad Rizieq bin Hussein Shihab (Arabic: مُحَمَّد رِزْق شِهَاب, romanized: Muḥammad Rizq Šihāb, pronounced [mʊˈħæmmæd rizq ʃihaːb]; more commonly known as Habib Rizieq Shihab (HRS) or simply Habib Rizieq; born 24 August 1965) is an Indonesian Islamist cleric, the founder and leader of the Islamist group Islamic Defenders Front (Indonesian: Front Pembela Islam, abbreviated as FPI), which was banned by the government in December 2020. Facing criminal charges in Indonesia, he lived in Riyadh, Saudi Arabia from 2017 to November 2020. Following his return to Indonesia, he was arrested in late 2020, accused of criminal incitement for holding crowded events that violated the COVID-19 pandemic regulations.

== Biography ==
=== Early life ===
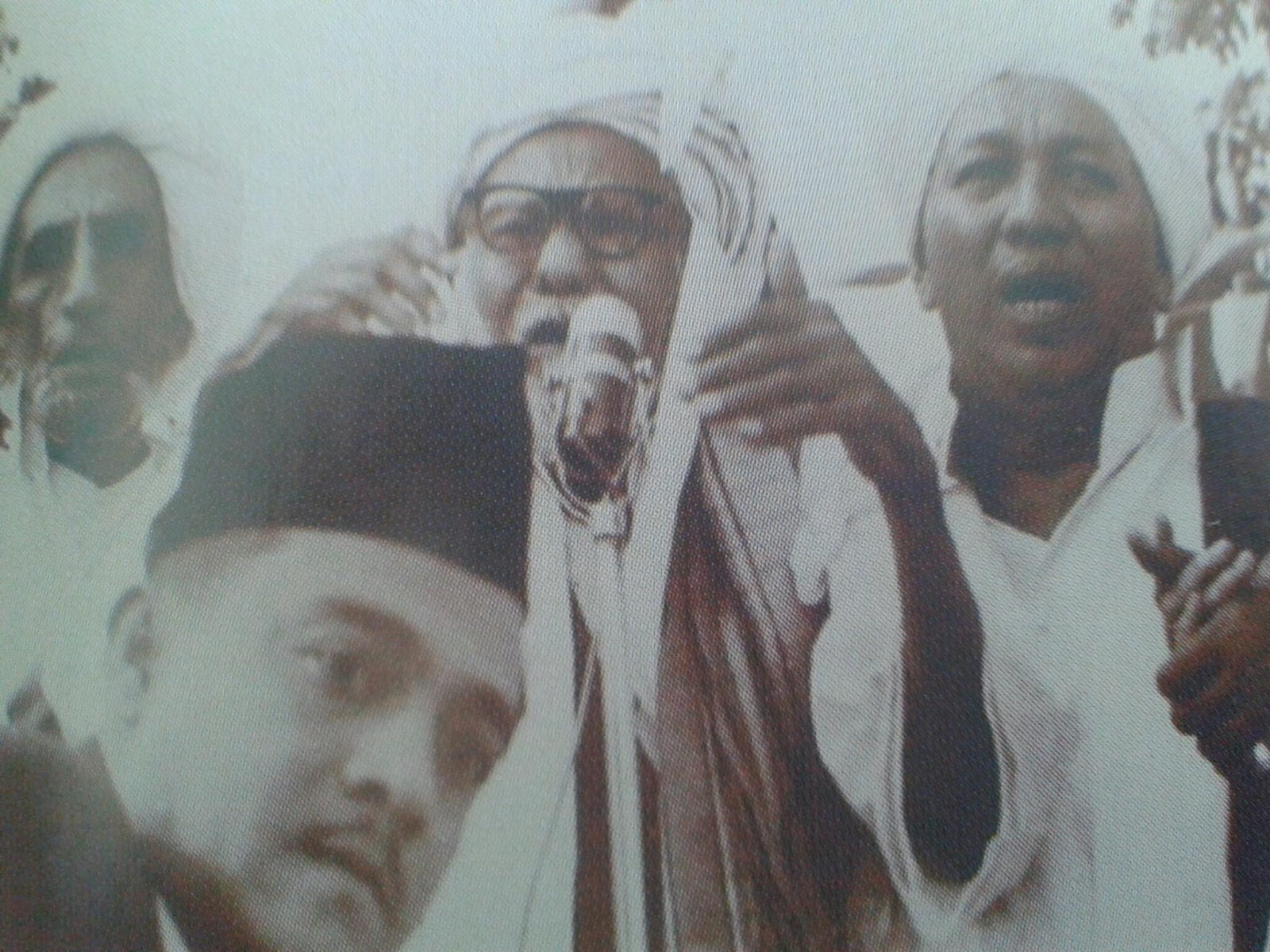
Father of Rizieq, Hussein Shihab (wearing black cap) with Habib Ali bin Husein al-Attas (left), Habib Ali bin Abdurrahman al-Habsyi (central), and Habib Muhammad bin Ali al-Habsyi (right), while attending the event of the Prophet's mawlid in Kwitang in 1950.

Rizieq was born in Petamburan, Tanah Abang, Central Jakarta on 24 August 1965 to Husein bin Shihab and Syarifah Sidah Alatas. Both his parents were Arab Indonesians of mixed Hadhrami and Betawi heritage. His father was Sayyid Husein bin Muhammad bin Husein bin Abdullah bin Husein bin Muhammad bin Shaikh bin Muhammad Shihab, born around 1920, a cofounder of Pandu Arab Indonesia Movement, a boy scouts-like movement for Arab Indonesians founded with his friends in 1937 (which later became PII or Islamic Scouting Organization of Indonesia.) His father died in 1966 when Rizieq was 11 months old, and because of that Rizieq was not put in boarding school. At the age of 4, he continued his education in the Qur'an at mosques. As a single parent, his mother worked as a tailor and bridal makeup artist.

=== Education ===
After graduating from SDN 1 (Public Elementary School No.1) Petamburan, Tanah Abang, Jakarta in 1975, Rizieq commenced junior high school at SMP 40 (Public Middle School No.40) in Pejompongan, Central Jakarta in 1976. However, the school was too far from his home so he transferred to a closer school, Bethel Christian Middle School in Petamburan, and graduated in 1979. He then attended SMAN 4 high school in Gambir, but graduated from the Islamic Village High School in Tangerang in 1982. Furthermore, he took Arabic classes at LIPIA in Jakarta. Considered by neighbors to be a troublesome youth with a penchant for getting into fights, his family sent Rizieq to Saudi Arabia in 1990 to study at King Saud University, majoring in Usul al-fiqh and Education, which he completed in four years with Cum Laude.

Rizieq took a graduate program at the International Islamic University Malaysia, but only for one year, after which he returned to Indonesia before finishing. This was because his scholarship funding was only adequate for him, not his whole family, to stay in Malaysia. Later, he was able to continue his education and earned an MA degree in Shariah from the same university in 2008 with a thesis titled "Pengaruh Pancasila terhadap Pelaksanaan Syariat Islam di Indonesia'" (The Influence of Pancasila on the Implementation of Islamic Laws in Indonesia).

In 2012, he returned to Malaysia and was admitted to a doctoral program in Da'wah and Management program at Fakulti Kepemimpinan dan Pengurusan (Faculty of Leadership and Administration) at Universiti Sains Islam Malaysia (USIM), and started working on his dissertation titled "مناهج التميز بين الأصول والفروع عند أهل السنة والجماعة" (The Distinction of Origins and Branches of Ahl Sunnah wa al-Jama'ah) under supervision of Prof. Dr. Kamaluddin Nurdin Marjuni and Dr. Ahmed Abdul Malek of Nigeria. Rizieq completed and earned his doctoral degree on 15 April 2021 while he was still in jail.

=== Personal life ===
Rizieq is a Sayyid with his clan Shihab (or Shihabuddin Aal bin Syech) lineage tracing back to Imam 'Alī ibn Abī Ṭālib through Imam Ahmad al-Muhajir. Meanwhile, his wife is also of a Sayyid family from Aal bin Yahya.

Rizieq and his family lived in Jakarta's Tanah Abang market district until moving to Saudi Arabia in 2017. They returned to Indonesia in November 2020. To make ends meet, Rizieq owned and operated a small store selling perfume and Muslim goods. He is married to Fadlun bin Yahya and has seven children, who were all schooled at Jamiat Kheir.

== Career ==
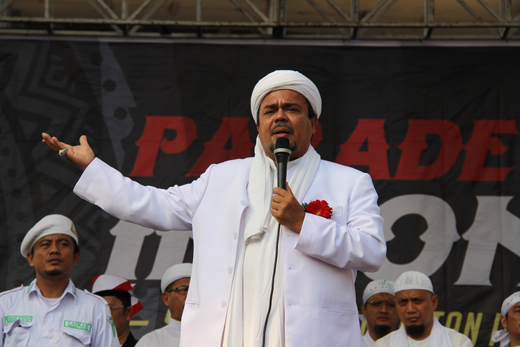
Rizieq preaching.

Rizieq worked as a high school teacher for about one year in Saudi Arabia after he finished his undergraduate study, before returning to Indonesia in 1992. In addition to giving religious lectures, Rizieq served as the principal of Madrasah Aliyah at Jamiat Kheir until 1996. He also taught Fiqh or Usul al-Fiqh at the school after his period as principal.

His organizational experience began when he joined Jamiat Kheir. He was a member of the Chamber of Shariah at BPRS At-Taqwa, Tangerang. Before becoming head of FPI, he chaired a number of Majelis Ta'lim (places where religious lectures take place) around Jakarta suburbs.

Rizieq declared the establishment of FPI on 17 August 1998. FPI gained notoriety for the Ketapang incident, which occurred in Jakarta over 22–23 November 1998, when about 200 FPI members attacked Ambonese Catholics, brutally killing 14 people. A number of residential houses and at least 13 churches were burned or attacked during the unrest.

Rizieq was jailed for seven months in 2003 for inciting his young, white-shirted followers, who often would hide their faces bandit-style behind handkerchiefs, to attack nightspots in Jakarta with clubs and stones. On 5 October 2008, Rizieq was jailed for one and half years due to a violent attack against the National Alliance for Freedom of Religion and Faith (Aliansi Kebangsaan untuk Kebebasan Beragama dan Berkeyakinan, AKKBB) which was holding a demonstration at Monas on 5 June 2008. Some 59 FPI members were arrested and 12 members of AKKBB were injured.

Rizieq was the head of FPI from 1998 to 2003, and since 2003 has chaired the group's Executive Board Tanfidz. He was elected Great Imam of FPI for life in 2013.

== Views ==
As declared on his FPI website, Rizieq and FPI's stances regarding the ISIS are:

1. The FPI remains steadfast in struggling to apply Shariah laws in the Homeland through within the guidelines of Shari'ah and the Constitution.
2. The FPI remains a faithful supporter of the Islamic Jihad Movement around the world, in the fight against all forms of unjust global hegemony (New Imperialism) that stand against the establishment of the World Islamic Caliphate as referred in the Manhaj Nubuwwah (The Prophet's Way).
3. The FPI strongly renounces all forms of warfare and sectarian violence in the name of Jihad among Muslims arising from differences in mazhab (school of thoughts) which are not fundamental issues in Islamic Theology (ʿAqīdah).
4. The FPI calls the whole Islamic Jihad movements to unite and work together in carrying out Shariah-based jihad without killing or mutilating civilians who are not involved in the war, whatever their Mazhab or religion is.
5. The FPI supports the appeal and advice of the al-Qaeda Leader Ayman al-Zawahiri that all Jihad components of Al-Qaeda, either Muhammad al-Jawlani's forces in Syria and troops of Abu Bakr al-Baghdadi in Iraq, as well as other Jihad components of Al-Qaeda, to unite and in brotherhood with all other brothers of the Islamic Mujahideen around the world, to continue the Jihad in Syria, Iraq, Palestine and other oppressed Muslim countries.

Rizieq said:

"People should not generalize that all Shia are heretical, nor none are led astray. Even Shia followers acknowledge that internally there are various Shiite groups, and some of them are led astray, namely the ones who deify Ali, believing the Angel Gabriel miscommunicated the message, or believing the Koran is supposed to be thicker than it is now. These are recognized by mainstream Shiites as misguided groups. In fact, these were the ones meant by the MUI fatwa earlier about Shia. There is something needs to be well recognized by Shiites that Ahlu Sunnah has a firm stance about Sahabah. For Sunnis, anyone who berate and moreover to say the Sahabah are unbelievers would be considered as a person being led astray. This is the key (towards reconciliation between Sunnis and Shiites)."

— Muhammad Rizieq Shihab, Habib Rizieq Shihab refuting Ustadz Yazid Jawas

In response to a controversial book with the title "Mulia dengan Manhaj Salaf" ("Being Noble with Manhaj Salaf") written by Yazid bin Abdul Qadir Jawas and published by the Pustaka At Taqwa, he says:

I am concerned about the presence of this book. If we open the chapter thirteenth which is the last chapter, here the author mentions several firqahs (sects) considered as misguided (considered as infidels) and misleading, such as the list item number eight mentions Asharites, the list item number nine includes Maturidiyyah. The number fourteen or thirteen includes sufism, number fourteen includes Tablighis, number fifteen includes Muslim Brotherhood, number seventeen includes Hizbut Tahrir, and the list item number twenty-seventh includes Jaringan Islam Liberal (JIL).

So Ash'ari and Maturidi, which representing Ahlus Sunnah wal Jamaah, are included in the group along with the misguided JIL which in fact is misleading. Even with the ease he said that Tablighi and the Muslim Brotherhood also go astray. Is this not the sort of divisive race?

If the author wants to disseminate his own respective ideologies, that is up to him. If he believes his Aqidah is the correct Aqidah, that is his business. If he feels his opinion is the most correct opinion, that is also his own business. But if he claims other Muslims groups are infidels, he has no right.

Such book divides people. If the author feels his Wahhabism doctrine is the most correct one and he is the pure, that is his right. He calls himself a follower of Salafi or in Indonesia known as the term Wahhabi. If he thinks he is the most holy, it is his right. If he thinks he is the most straight, that is also his right. But he has no right to call other fellow Muslim groups as gone astray, pagans or infidels.

Moreover, the adherent Muslims of the Ash'ari and Maturidi have been around for over 1000 years as the representatives of Ahlus Sunnah wal Jama'ah, while the Wahhabism is just born yesterday (recently), but yet continuously wants to call Ash'arites as infidels. Indeed, during this more than 1000 years who have been actually called as the (truly) Ahlus Sunnah? For 1000 years Ash'ari and Maturidi have been the ones called Ahlus Sunnah. Wahhabism is not in the list. It has just emerged recently, but yet it wants to judge other Muslim sects who do not agree with it as misguided Muslims.

He also stated that Indonesia, Malaysia and Brunei, as states with the large majority of the population are of Ash'ari must also have a law forbidding the spread of Wahhabism. He has been also accused by Wahhabi-affiliated news media as a Shiite, because he does not want to say that all Shia Muslims are led astray, although he also says that the spread of Shia should be limited or even forbidden.

=== Israel-Palestinian conflict ===
Rizieq is an ardent supporter of Palestine in the decades-long conflict against Israeli occupation. In 2003, he said he was recruiting jihadist troops to seize control of Al-Aqsa in Jerusalem, saying, "If we could send [jihadist] soldiers for Afghanistan, why not for Palestine?" He criticized Muslim nations for only uttering rhetoric to condemn Israel without making real sacrifices to protect their suffering fellow Muslims in Palestine. Rizieq and FPI have solicited donations to help Palestinians in the occupied territories and to provide financial support to groups intending to fight for Palestinian independence.

=== Hostility against Ahmadiyyah ===
One of Rizieq Shihab's campaigns openly called for hostility against Ahmadis:

"We call on the Muslim community. Let us go to war with Ahmadiyyah! Kill Ahmadiyyah wherever they are!........ And, if they talk about human rights? Human rights are satanic! Human rights are crap!.....If they want to know who is responsible for killing Ahmadiyyah, it is I; it is FPI and others from the Muslim community who are responsible for killing Ahmadiyyah! Say that Sobri Lubis ordered it, that Habib Rizieq and FPI ordered it!

=== Hostility against pluralism ===
In an article posted on official Islamic Defenders Front website titled "True Mu'min" he wrote that Muslims should reject pluralism, secularism, acceptance of LGBT, zina, pornography, and voting for non-Muslim leaders even when it's allowed by constitution. He wrote:

True Mu'min must reject secularism, pluralism, liberalism, LGBT, apostasy, heresy, shamanism, corruption, khamr, drugs, gambling, prostitution, adultery, pornography, pornoaction, injustice, tyranny, immorality, evilness, and leadership of a kafir over muslims, even when the constitution permits it because Qur'an and sunnah forbid it.

== Legal issues ==
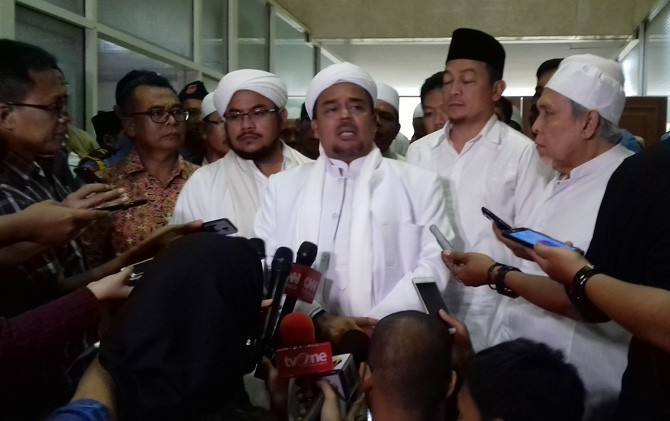
Rizieq Shihab faces the media after being implicated in an alleged pornography case.

- In 2003, Rizieq insulted Indonesia's National Police during a live interview with SCTV and Trans TV.
- In 2003, Rizieq was sentenced to seven months in prison for disturbing public order by ordering the FPI to ransack and destroy several Jakarta nightlife venues. He served his sentence at Salemba Penitentiary.
- In 2008, Rizieq was imprisoned for one and a half years for assaulting members of the National Alliance for Freedom of Religion and Faith (Aliansi Kebangsaan untuk Kebebasan Beragama dan Berkeyakinan) during their convention at National Monument square.
- In 2009, Rizieq insulted former president Abdurrahman Wahid during a live interview with TVOne.
- In early November 2015, Rizieq was reported for insulting Sundanese people by changing the Sundanese greeting of sampurasun to "Campur Racun" ("mix with poison").
- As a supporter of former general Prabowo Subianto's failed campaigns in the 2014 Indonesian presidential election and 2019 Indonesian presidential election, Rizieq has been a vocal opponent of President Joko Widodo. In 2015, Rizieq made a speech allegedly containing hate speech that insulted Jokowi.
- In January 2017, police declared Rizieq a suspect in a case of slander against Pancasila, Indonesia's state ideology.
- In January 2017, the FPI called for the withdrawal of Indonesia's rupiah banknotes, accusing Bank Indonesia of concealing the communist hammer-and-sickle symbol in the currency. The allegation was rejected, as the symbol is a rectoverso security feature showing Bank Indonesia's logo. The FPI was accused of stirring public unrest, slandering Bank Indonesia and the government, and insulting the rupiah, the national currency being a state symbol and protected under law.
- On 30 December 2020, when the government disbanded FPI, authorities released a video showing Rizieq in 2014 pledging his and FPI's allegiance to the Islamic State of Iraq and the Levant (ISIS) and support for an ISIS-style caliphate. The video, touted as proof of links to terror groups, was cited as one of reasons for FPI's disbandment.

== Self-imposed exile and return ==
On 26 April 2017, Rizieq left Indonesia for Saudi Arabia on a visa to perform an umrah. His departure came after he was summoned by police as a witness for questioning over alleged pornography involving the exchange of graphic messages and nude photos with a woman named Firza Hussein. On 29 May 2017, police named Shihab a suspect under the 2006 Anti-Pornography Act, a law he helped pass. Rizieq was also charged with insulting Indonesia's Pancasila state ideology, which he had derisively called pantat ("buttocks").

In September 2018, the Indonesian Embassy in Saudi Arabia said Rizieq had overstayed his visa and lacked a valid permit to remain in the country. The statement came after he was reportedly questioned and detained by Saudi Arabian police because an ISIL flag was allegedly flown at his home. A month later, Saudi Arabia's ambassador to Indonesia said Rizieq had not violated any laws in Saudi Arabia.

In 2019, Indonesian National Police dropped the two cases against Rizieq, citing a lack of evidence. On 29 December 2020, Indonesian court overturned the police decision about the pornographic chat case, demanding the National Police to continue their investigation, and declaring that the decision to stop the investigation is unlawful.

In December 2019, Rizieq claimed the Indonesian government was preventing him from returning to Indonesia — a claim denied by the Indonesian ambassador to Saudi Arabia.

On 10 November 2020, Rizieq returned from Saudi Arabia. The Indonesian ambassador to Saudi Arabia said Shihab was deported for violating Saudi Arabia's immigration law. Previously, Rizieq had threatened to sue anyone who accused him of breaking the immigration law.

=== Post-return controversies ===
Ignoring government regulations on COVID-19 health protocols for social distancing, thousands of Rizieq's supporters went to Soekarno-Hatta International Airport to welcome him home on 10 November 2020, creating traffic jams and delaying multiple flights. Many of his supporters did not wear masks. Rizieq called on the crowd to carry out a "moral revolution".

Rizieq reiterated his call for a moral revolution while addressing events that attracted crowds around his home in Jakarta's Petamburan neighborhood, and also at Megamendung district in Bogor regency. On 14 November, Rizieq celebrated the marriage of his daughter in conjunction with a celebration of the Prophet Muhammad's birthday, attracting a crowd of around 10,000 people who did not adhere to social distancing. On 16 November 2020, Jakarta Police chief Nana Sudjana and West Java Police chief Rudy Sufahradi Novianti were fired for their failure to enforce COVID-19 health protocols. The Indonesian military, police and public order officials subsequently removed around 900 banners of Rizieq that been erected around Jakarta. Members of the public responded by sending floral congratulatory boards to Jakarta Military Headquarters.

At least 80 people who attended the events held by Rizieq later tested positive to COVID-19. Among the high-profile figures who tested positive for the virus after meeting Rizieq were Jakarta Governor Anies Baswedan, Jakarta Deputy Governor Ahmad Riza Patria, and Depok mayoral candidate Muhammad Idris.

Health authorities were concerned that Rizieq's gatherings were creating new clusters of COVID-19 and wanted to test him for the virus, but he refused to undergo a swab test. He later checked into Rumah Sakit UMMI in Bogor, West Java, claiming "tiredness after a long journey" after police said they may summon him over the gatherings. He sparked controversy by leaving the hospital from a back door. Shihab was swab-tested by MER-C, a human rights organization, which declined to reveal the result. Indonesia's COVID-19 Task Force said that while Indonesian law protects the privacy of patients, the result of any swab test should be disclosed to the proper authorities in the interest of contact tracing. Later during his trial on the charge of refusing to be swab tested, the prosecutor stated that his test result is positive.

On 2 December 2020, Rizieq apologized for the crowds at four of his gatherings and said he would pay a Rp50 million fine imposed by the Jakarta administration.

Jakarta Police had intended to question Rizieq and his son-in-law at 10:00am on 7 December 2020. However, earlier that morning, Rizieq and members of his family were reportedly being driven at about 12:30am to attend a pre-dawn prayer meeting, escorted by two cars of bodyguards. A car with undercover police followed the group on Jakarta-Cikampek toll road and was allegedly boxed in by the vehicles of Rizieq's bodyguards, who then allegedly shot at the police and attacked them with sharp weapons. Police responded by shooting dead six of Rizieq's bodyguards, while four fled. Police alleged that Rizieq's guards had started the shootout by firing three shots at the officers. FPI said Rizieq was assaulted and shot at by unknown groups, and that six of its members were kidnapped by an unknown group. FPI secretary general Munarman denied the FPI members had been carrying guns or sharp weapons. Legislators and human rights activists called for an independent investigation into the killings.

=== 2021 trial ===
Police on 10 December 2020 charged Rizieq with incitement of criminal acts and obstructing law enforcement for holding mass gatherings at Petamburan that breached COVID-19 health protocols. On 12 December, he was arrested and questioned by police, who said he would be detained for 20 days. On 30 December, the police announced that his detention would be extended until 1 February 2021.

Rizieq was to have gone on trial at East Jakarta District Court on 15 March 2021 for alleged violation of COVID-19 health protocols and refusing to be swab-tested, but the online hearing was postponed because a technical problem prevented the defendant from hearing the presiding judge. On 16 March, by which time the technical problem had been resolved, one of Rizieq's lawyers, Munarman, said the defense team would not participate in an online trial. He asked the team of lawyers to leave the courtroom. Rizieq, who was linked to the online trial via a live stream from the Criminal Investigation Unit of the National Police, joined the walkout, declaring he would not attend an online trial.

On 19 March, the presiding judge, Suparman Nyompa, rejected Rizieq's request to be tried in person at East Jakarta District Court, saying his presence would attract a large crowd of supporters. He said an online trial is of equal validity to a regular trial. After the prosecutor read out the indictment, Rizieq ignored questions from the judges and instead prayed and recited from the Qur'an. Following Rizieq's refusal to cooperate, the presiding judge on 23 March said that in order for the trial to run smoothly, it would be held offline. On 27 May 2021, the court sentenced Rizieq and five other FPI members to eight months in jail for violating COVID-19 health protocols. On 24 March 2021, the same court sentenced Rizieq to four years in jail for spreading false information by claiming to be healthy despite having tested positive to COVID-19.

== Publications ==
- Hancurkan Liberalisme, Tegakkan Syariat Islam (Destroy Liberalism, Establish Islamic Sharia), 2011.
- Wawasan Kebangsaan Menuju NKRI Bersyariah (National Insight towards the Sharia-based NKRI), 2012.
- Dialog FPI, Amar Ma'ruf Nahi Munkar.
- The collection of Salawat.

== Awards and honors ==
On 19 March 2009, Habib Rizieq was crowned by the self-proclaimed Sultan Sulu Ismael Kiram II as the Grand Mufti of the Sultanate of Sulu with title Datu Paduka Maulana Syar'i Sulu (DPMSS).
