= Petamburan, Tanah Abang =

Petamburan
- Administrative village
- Interactive map of Petamburan
- Coordinates: 6°12′S 106°48′E
- Country: Indonesia
- Province: DKI Jakarta
- Administrative city: Central Jakarta
- District: Tanah Abang

Area
  - Total: 0.90 km^{2} (0.35 sq mi)

Population (2019)
  - Total: 32,946
  - Density: 36,606/km^{2} (94,810/sq mi)
- Postal code: 10260

Petamburan is an administrative village in the Tanah Abang district of Indonesia. It has postal code of 10260. The area is 0.90 km^{2}. The population is 32,946 as of 2019. There are 16,900 males and 16,046 females.

== Origin ==
There are two theories behind this name. One suggests that every European who died, the locals would play the drums. Another suggests that this is where military drums are made, because the army needs it.

== Geography ==
It is located bordered by West Jakarta in the north and west, Kebon in the east, and Bendungan in the south.

== Demographics ==
Due to the location being part of the capital of Indonesia, there are various ethnicities who inhabit this area. This includes Betawi, Javanese, Sundanese, Bantenese, Bataks, Miningkabau, Arabs, and Chinese peoples.

By religion, 83.49% are Muslims, 16.00% are Christians (13.00% Protestants and 3.00% Catholics), 0.30% are Hindus, and 0.20% are Buddhists.

== See also ==
- Tanah Abang
- List of administrative villages of Jakarta
