= 2021 in Indonesia =

- Centuries: 20th; 21st
- Decades: 2000s; 2010s; 2020s
- See also: History of Indonesia; Timeline of Indonesian history; List of years in Indonesia

2021 (MMXXI) was a common year starting on Friday of the Gregorian calendar, the 2021st year of the Common Era (CE) and Anno Domini (AD) designations, the 21st year of the 3rd millennium and the 21st century, and the 2nd year of the 2020s decade.

The year was marked with the government's COVID-19 vaccination program across Indonesia, which commenced since the vaccination of President Joko Widodo on a live televised event. Due to the outbreak of the more contagious COVID-19 Delta variant, a second wave of COVID-19 cases occurred on June - August, causing hospitals to be filled at near full capacity. The outbreak led the government to impose more restrictions on social activities in public.

During that year, Indonesia was also struck by multiple notable disasters. In January, more than one hundred were killed after an earthquake struck West Sulawesi. In early April, hundreds of people were killed after Cyclone Seroja struck the province of East Nusa Tenggara. On that same month, The Indonesian Navy suffered one of its deadliest accident following the sinking of Nanggala II off the coast of Bali. In December, dozens of people were killed after Mount Semeru erupted.

== Incumbents ==
=== President and Vice President ===
President	Vice President
Joko Widodo	Ma'ruf Amin

=== Ministers and Coordinating Ministers ===
==== Coordinating Ministers ====
Photo	Position	Name
	Coordinating Minister of Political, Legal, and Security Affairs	Mahfud MD
	Coordinating Minister of Economic Affairs	Airlangga Hartarto
	Coordinating Minister of Maritime Affairs and Investment	Luhut Binsar Pandjaitan
	Coordinating Minister of Human Development and Culture	Muhadjir Effendy

==== Ministers ====
Photo	Position	Name
	Minister of State Secretariat	Pratikno
	Minister of Home Affairs	Tito Karnavian
	Minister of Foreign Affairs	Retno Marsudi
	Minister of Defence	Prabowo Subianto
	Minister of Law and Human Rights	Yasonna Laoly
	Minister of Finance	Sri Mulyani
	Minister of Energy and Mineral Resources	Arifin Tasrif
	Minister of Industry	Agus Gumiwang Kartasasmita
	Minister of Trade	Muhammad Lutfi
	Minister of Agriculture	Syahrul Yasin Limpo
	Minister of Environment and Forestry	Siti Nurbaya Bakar
	Minister of Transportation	Budi Karya Sumadi
	Minister of Marine Affairs and Fisheries	Sakti Wahyu Trenggono
	Minister of Manpower	Ida Fauziyah
	Minister of Public Works and Public Housing	Basuki Hadimuljono
	Minister of Health	Budi Gunadi Sadikin
	Minister of Education, Culture, Research and Technology	Nadiem Makarim
	Minister of Agrarian Affairs and Spatial Planning	Sofyan Djalil
	Minister of Social Affairs	Tri Rismaharini
	Minister of Religious Affairs	Yaqut Cholil Qoumas
	Minister of Communication and Information Technology	Johnny G. Plate
	Minister of Research and Technology	Bambang Brodjonegoro
	Minister of Cooperatives and Small & Medium Enterprises	Teten Masduki
	Minister of Women's Empowerment and Child Protection	I Gusti Ayu Bintang Darmawati
	Minister of Administrative and Bureaucratic Reform	Tjahjo Kumolo
	Minister of Villages, Development of Disadvantaged Regions and Transmigration	Abdul Halim Iskandar
	Minister of National Development Planning	Suharso Monoarfa
	Minister of State-Owned Enterprises	Erick Thohir
	Minister of Tourism and Creative Economy	Sandiaga Uno
	Minister of Youth and Sports	Zainudin Amali
	Minister of Investment	Bahlil Lahadalia

== Events ==
=== January ===
- 1 January – A fisherman from Sulawesi recovered a Chinese seaglider off the coast of South Sulawesi, raising questions on the security of Indonesian airspace and waters.
- 3 January – At least 20 people were injured after a tornado struck a residential area in Cirebon Regency, West Java.
- 7 January – Abu Bakar Ba'asyir, the spiritual leader of the Jemaah Islamiyah terrorist organization, was released from Gunung Sindur prison.
- 8 January
  - Indonesian Ulema Council (MUI) declared Chinese Sinovac COVID-19 vaccine as halal, ending a longstanding perception conflict among anti-vaccine believers which states that the vaccine is haram.
  - Investigation by National Commission on Human Rights (Komnas HAM) revealed that there were indications of human rights violations on the shooting of 6 FPI members.
  - COVID-19 cases number in Indonesia reached the 800,000 mark.

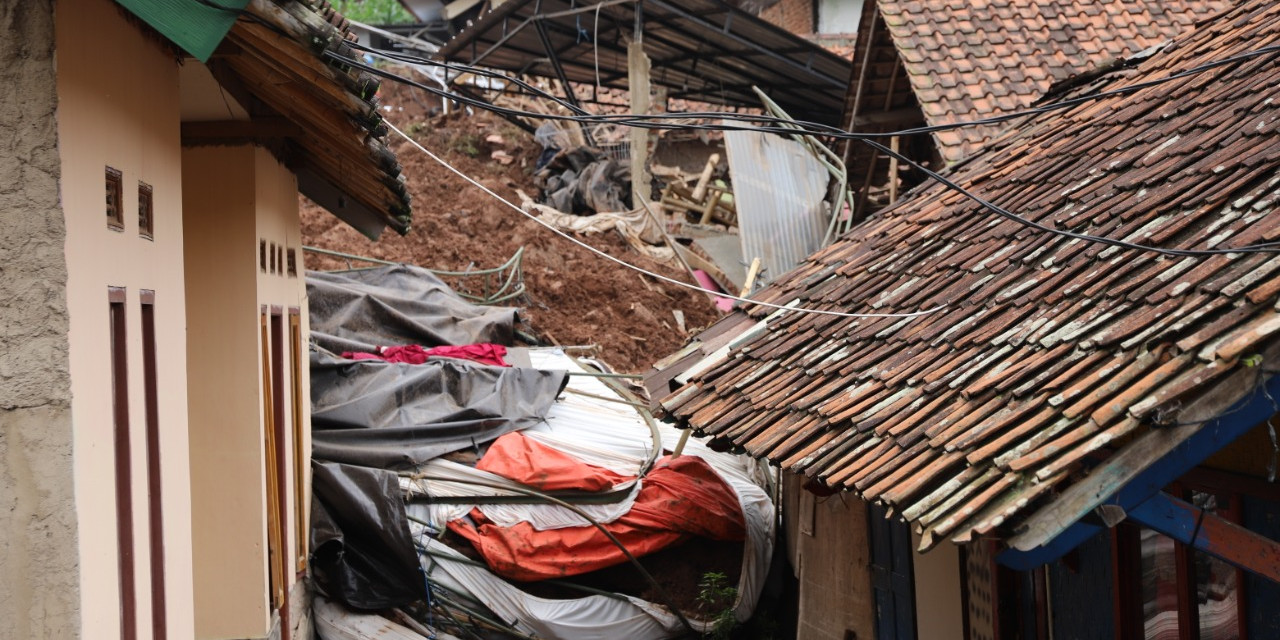
At least 40 people were killed after a landslide struck residential homes in Sumedang, West Java

- 9 January
  - A massive landslide struck a residential area in Cihanjuang, Sumedang, West Java. At least 40 people were killed and 25 people were Injured.
  - Sriwijaya Air Flight 182 crashed into the Java Sea off the Thousand Islands, North Jakarta after taking off from Soekarno-Hatta International Airport. killing all 62 passengers and crews on board.
  - Owner of Indonesian e-commerce company Grab Toko, Yudha Manggala Putra was arrested for fake news and alleged fraud.
- 11 January
  - At least 4 miners were killed and 5 others were injured after a landslide struck a gold mine in South Solok Regency, West Sumatra.
  - National Agency of Drug and Food Control of Republic of Indonesia (BPOM) authorized the Sinovac COVID-19 vaccine for emergency use.
- 12 January – A massive flood swept South Kalimantan after two rivers burst its banks. More than 6,000 homes were submerged and more than 20,000 people were evacuated. At least 5 bodies were recovered from the flood.
- 13 January
  - The first vaccine administration in Indonesia took place in Jakarta. President Joko Widodo was vaccinated with Sinovac vaccine on a live televised event.
  - Chairman of General Elections Commission, Arief Budiman, was fired due to "ethical codes violation".
- 14 January – National Commission on Human Rights (Komnas HAM) announced that the commission didn't find any indications of severe human rights violation during the shooting of 6 FPI members in December 2020.
- 15 January
  - Indonesia recorded its highest daily increase of COVID-19 to date, with nearly 13,000 positive cases.
  - A magnitude 6.2 earthquake struck Majene, West Sulawesi. The earthquake struck at a depth of 10 km, with its epicentre located at least 6 km from Majene Regency. Dozens of structures, including a hotel and West Sulawesi's gubernatorial building, were destroyed. At least 105 people died and more than 800 wounded.
- 17 January
  - At least 5 people were killed and 500 were displaced after a flash flood and landslide struck Manado, North Sulawesi.
  - COVID-19 cases number in Indonesia reached the 900,000 mark.
- 20 January – A Twitter thread made by two American citizens living in Bali caused heavy backlash among Indonesians due to a perceived exploitation of the loopholes of Indonesian immigration policy. Both of them were later deported.
- 21 January – A magnitude 7.0 earthquake struck Talaud Islands Regency, North Sulawesi at a depth of more than 100 km. Structural damage were reported in several districts.
- 23 January
  - Controversy and public outcry after an alleged enforcement of hijab to non-Muslim students in Padang, West Sumatra.
  - Minister of Education and Culture Nadiem Makarrim threatened "serious consequences" for people who were involved in the incident.
- 25 January
  - Indonesian coastguard seized an Iranian and a Panamanian tankers off the coast of Borneo.
  - At least 10 people were killed after a mine collapse in Tanah Bumbu Regency, South Kalimantan.
- 26 January
  - Indonesia reached a new grim milestone as number of COVID-19 cases pass 1 million, the highest in Southeast Asia.
  - A politician from People's Conscience Party, Ambroncius Nababan, was accused of racism after allegedly posted a photo of Papuan members of National Human Rights Commission Natalius Pigai and comparing it to a gorilla. Ambroncius was then summoned by the Indonesian National Police and was later declared as a suspect.
- 27 January – Listyo Sigit Prabowo was chosen as the new Chief of the Indonesian National Police.

=== February ===
- 1 February – Leader of Indonesia's Democratic Party, Agus Harimurti Yudhoyono, claimed that one of the senior officials with close ties to Joko Widodo had planned for a "coup d'état" within the party, with a goal of deposing him from his position as the party's leader.
- 3 February – Governor of Central Java, Ganjar Pranowo, announced a provincial level partial-lockdown for two days.
- 4 February – Authorities transferred 26 suspected terrorists from Makassar and Gorontalo to an exclusive penitentiary in Cikeas for tighter surveillance.
- 6 February
  - Two Sumatran tigers escaped from a zoo in Singkawang after a landslide struck the enclosure. At least one zookeeper was killed. One of the tiger was later shot dead.
  - At least 3 people were killed after a massive flood and landslide swept through Semarang, Central Java.
- 7 February – Indonesian Food and Drug Monitoring Agency (BPOM) approved the Sinovac COVID-19 vaccine for use in the elderly.
- 8 February
  - Banyuwangi Airport was closed due to ashfall from Mount Raung eruption.
  - As of 8 February, more than 1,000 residents had evacuated after a massive flood swept parts of Jakarta.
  - Hundreds of residents were evacuated due to floods in Indramayu, West Java.
- 9 February – More than 35,000 people were evacuated after a massive flood swept through 11 districts in Subang Regency, West Java. A total of 5 people were killed due to the flood.
- 11 February – At least 3 people were killed after a tug boat exploded in Mahakam River, Samarinda.

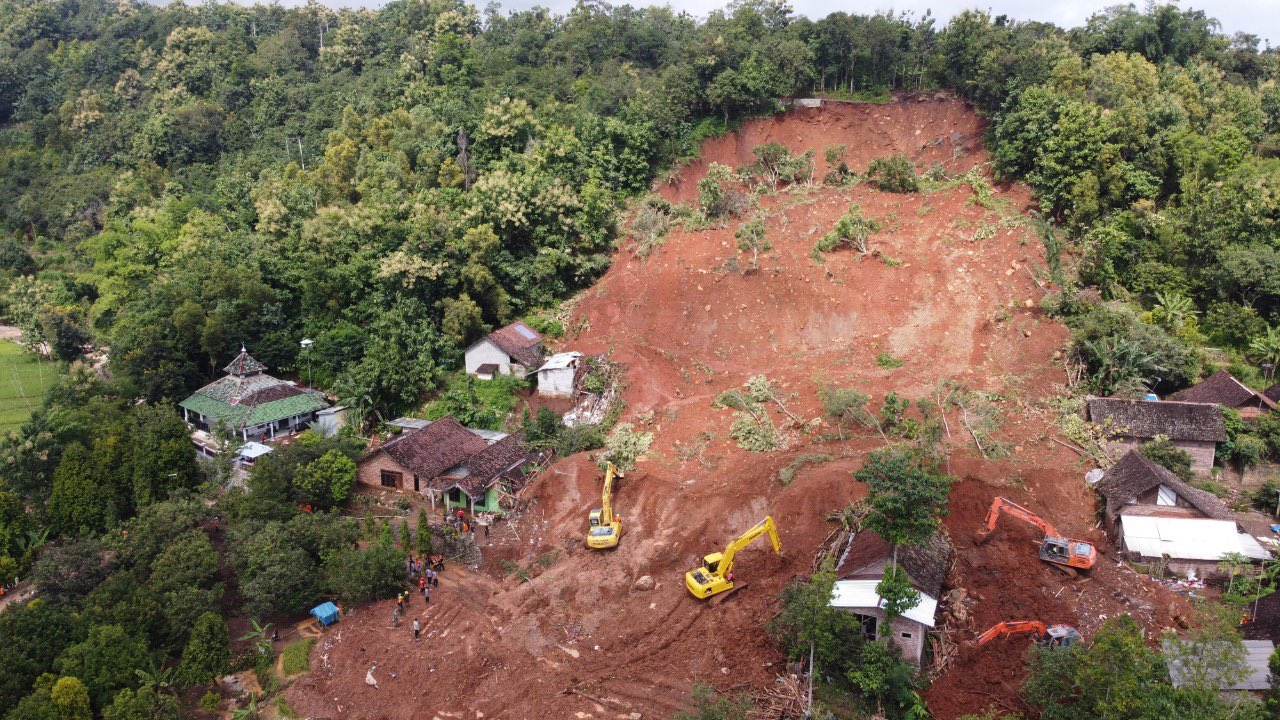
A landslide in Nganjuk Regency, East Java buried dozens of homes and residents. At least 23 people were killed in the disaster.

- 15 February – At least 23 people were listed as missing after a massive landslide struck a village in Nganjuk Regency, East Java.
- 16 February – Indonesian President Joko Widodo ordered the Indonesian People's Representatives Council to revise the controversial Electronic Information and Transactions (ITE) law.
- 20 February – At least 5 people were killed and hundreds evacuated after massive flood swept the Indonesian capital Jakarta.
- 24 February
  - At least 1 person was injured and 170 houses were damaged after a tornado struck a village in Demak, Central Java.
  - Five santriwati were killed after a landslide struck a pesantren in Pamekasan.
  - Dozens missing after a landslide struck a gold mine in Parigi Moutong Regency, Central Sulawesi.
- 25 February – A shootout at a cafe in Cengkareng, West Jakarta, killed at least 3 people including one member of the Indonesian National Armed Forces.
- 26 February – At least 400 houses were damaged or destroyed after a tornado struck villages in Demak, Central Java.
- 27 February – KPK arrested the governor of South Sulawesi Nurdin Abdullah for an alleged corruption case. A total of Rp1 billion rupiah was seized.

=== March ===
- 1 March – Some 43 to 60 houses were destroyed and 400 others damaged by a flood in Dompu Regency, West Nusa Tenggara.
- 3 March – Governor of West Java Ridwan Kamil reported the first case of the new COVID-19 UK-variant in Indonesia.
- 5 March
  - Members of the Democratic Party's Extraordinary Congress (KLB) in Sibolangit declared former Presidential Chief of Staff Moeldoko as the party's General Chairman.
  - Numerous condemnations came from Democratic Party members. Incumbent General Chairman of Democrat Party Agus Harimurti Yudhoyono described the declaration as illegitimate and unconstitutional.
- 6 March – Ministry of Health announced tighter screenings in multiple airports and seaports after the discovery of COVID-19 variant in West Java.
- 10 March
  - A tourist bus carrying 66 people, including pilgrims, teachers and high school students, plunged into a ravine in Subang, West Java, killing 27 people and injuring 39.
  - Indonesian National Agency of Drug and Food Control (BPOM) approved the Oxford–AstraZeneca COVID-19 vaccine for emergency use in Indonesia.
- 15 March – Amien Rais accused the government of planning to increase the presidential term limit from two terms to three terms.
- 17 March – BPOM halted the rollout of AstraZeneca vaccine until further research on the vaccine's blood clot issue.
- 18 March – Forced withdrawal of Indonesian badminton players from the 2021 All England Open sparked criticism from the Indonesian public.
- 19 March
  - Muslim cleric Rizieq Shihab went on trial for allegedly violating COVID-19 health protocols.
  - BPOM declared AstraZeneca vaccine safe, approving the vaccine's rollout.
- 20 March – A Trigana Air Service Boeing 737-4Y0 skidded off the runway at Halim Perdanakusuma International Airport, East Jakarta. The plane's four occupants were uninjured.
- 22 March – A motor vessel carrying 16 people sank off the coast of Jakarta, resulting in three deaths.
- 25 March – At least 10 people were killed by a fire at a packed residential area in Matraman, East Jakarta.
- 26 March – The government banned Indonesians from mudik for the second time since 2020.
- 28 March – A husband and wife perpetrated a suicide bombing during a Palm Sunday service at Sacred Heart Cathedral in Makassar, South Sulawesi. At least 20 people were injured in the attack.
- 29 March
  - Balongan Oil Refinery in Indramayu was hit by an explosive fire. Five people were injured and more than 900 nearby residents were evacuated.
  - COVID-19 cases in Indonesia pass 1.5 million.
- 31 March
  - The Ministry of Law and Human Rights dismissed the outcome of the Democratic Party's 2021 Extraordinary Congress.
  - A terrorist attacked the Indonesian National Police headquarters in Jakarta and was later shot dead by police. The perpetrator was the sole fatality in the incident.

=== April ===
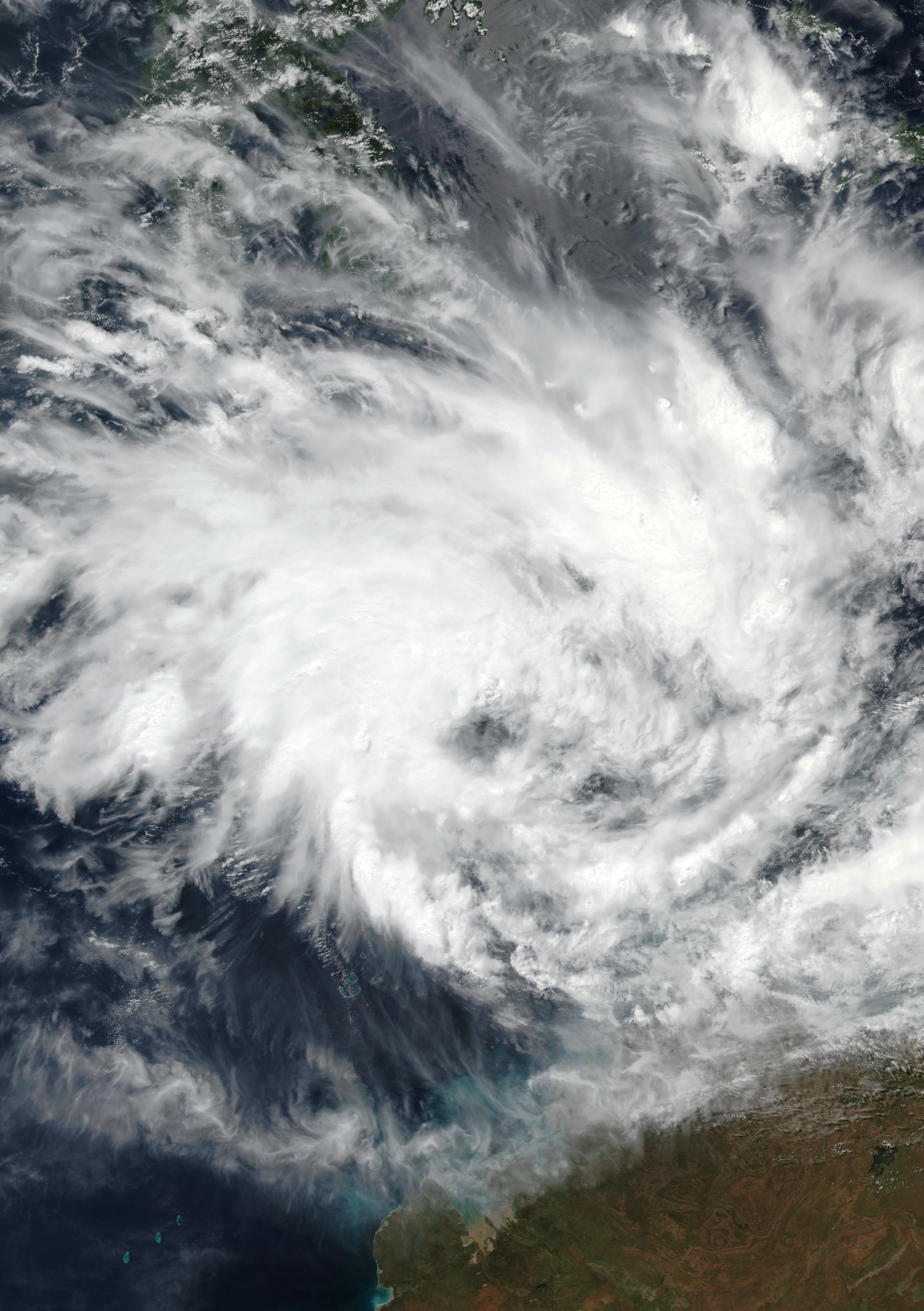
On early April, Cyclone Seroja struck East Nusa Tenggara, causing widespread destruction in the province.

- 3 April – At least 17 crew members went missing after two vessels collided off the coast of Indramayu, West Java.
- 4 April – Hundreds dead or missing after Cyclone Seroja struck East Nusa Tenggara.
- 5 April – Djoko Tjandra was sentenced to 4.5 years in prison for bribing police and a state prosecutor.
- 6 April – Long-time fugitive Samin Tan was arrested by KPK.
- 8 April – The United Nations's special rapporteur on extreme poverty and human rights issued a report accusing the Indonesian government of several violations of human rights on the construction of the international MotoGP circuit in Mandalika, West Nusa Tenggara.
- 10 April – At least 9 people were killed and more than a hundred were wounded after a 6.7 magnitude earthquake struck the southern coast of Malang, East Java.
- 13 April – Tourism Minister Sandiaga Uno refutes UN allegations of human rights violations in Mandalika.
- 18 April – Aceh officially adopts a qanun on sharia' banking. Banks that do not implement sharia law within their branches in Aceh are forced to close.
- 20 April – Indonesian government decided to approve the research of Nusantara COVID-19 vaccine.

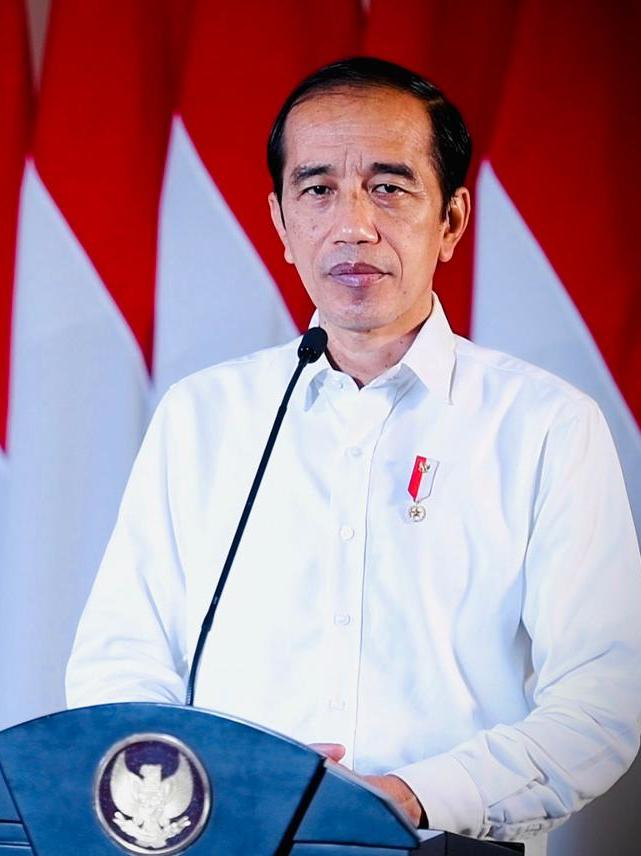
President Joko Widodo during a press conference on the disappearance of KRI Nanggala (402) off the coast of Bali on 21 April 2021

- 21 April – KRI Nanggala (402), an attack submarine owned by the Indonesian Armed Forces, disappeared off the coast of Bali during a live torpedo drill.
- 24 April – Central government barred Indian citizens from entering Indonesia after a deadly second wave of COVID-19 in India caused fear among the public.
- 25 April
  - The wreckage of the KRI Nanggala (402) submarine was found on the sea floor off Bali. Indonesian Navy later confirmed that all 53 crewmen had died in the disaster.
  - Papua's Chief of Indonesian National Intelligence Agency was assassinated by armed groups (KKB) in Papua.
- 27 April – Anger after the discovery of authorities using used COVID-19 rapid test tool in Kualanamu International Airport.
- 28 April – President Joko Widodo inaugurated Nadiem Makarim as Indonesian Minister of Education and Culture – Research and Technology and Bahlil Lahadalia as Minister of Investment.
- 29 April
  - In response to the growing number of violence in Papua, the Indonesian government declared Papuan rebels as terrorists.
  - Former chairman of the National Mandate Party, Amien Rais, announced the creation of a new Islamic party called the Ummat Party.
- 30 April – BPOM authorized the Sinopharm BIBP COVID-19 vaccine for emergency use.

=== May ===
- 4 May – Ministry of Health confirmed the first cases of the South African variant and Indian 'double mutant' variant of COVID-19 in Indonesia.
- 5 May – Criticisms after questionable civil exam questions caused 75 KPK employees to fail, including prominent KPK investigator Novel Baswedan, who is also an acid attack survivor.
- 6 May – 17 May – In response to Indonesian government's decision to ban mudik, authorities deployed multiple personnel throughout Indonesia.
- 7 May
  - Supreme Court of Indonesia decided not to implement the Joint Ministerial Decree (SKB) on school uniforms and ordered to recall the issuance of the SKB.
  - Mount Sinabung erupted, sending ash as high as 2,800 meters into the sky.
- 10 May
  - Regent of Nganjuk Regency Novi Rahman Hidayat was arrested by KPK for a suspected bribery case.
  - At least 8 people were killed after a landslide struck an illegal gold mine in South Solok Regency, West Sumatra.
- 13 May – A Firecracker explosion in Kebumen Regency kills 4 people.
- 15 May – At least 6 people were killed, 3 were missing after a tourist boat capsized in Kedungombo reservoir, Boyolali Regency.
- 17 May – Indonesian government temporarily halted the distribution of AstraZeneca COVID-19 vaccine after reports of serious side effects.
- 21 May – More than 1,300 houses were damaged after a strong magnitude 5.9 Richter scale earthquake struck Blitar at a shallow depth of 10 km.
- 22 May – A passenger boat carrying 26 people sank off the coast of Jambi, killing at least 8.
- 26 May – At least 8 people were killed after a pickup truck struck a tree in Malang.
- 28 May – A Robinson R44 helicopter crashed onto a lake in Depok, West Java.

=== June ===
- 3 June – Government confirms that it will not embark Hajj pilgrims for this year's Hajj due to the ongoing COVID-19 outbreak.
- 11 June – Indonesian Mining Advocacy Network (Jatam) asked authorities to investigate the death of Vice Regent of Sangihe Islands Regency Helmud Hontong after dubbing his death as suspicious.
- 14 June – North Sulawesi forensic analyst reported that preliminary findings from the autopsy of Helmud Hontong didn't indicate signs of intentional poisoning.
- 16 June – A 0.5-meter-high (1.6 ft) tsunami struck Central Maluku Regency after a magnitude 6.1 earthquake caused an undersea landslide. No injuries were reported.
- 17 June
  - Bank Indonesia bans cryptocurrency as legal payment.
  - WHO warned the government of Indonesia of a possible COVID-19 surge caused by Delta variant of the virus.
- 21 June
  - COVID-19 cases reached 2 million, highest in Southeast Asia.
  - Government announced harsher restrictions in several regions after surge in COVID-19 cases across Indonesia.
- 24 June
  - Clashes in the street after controversial hardline cleric Rizieq Shihab was sentenced to 4 years in prison for "lying on his COVID-19 test result".
  - Unidentified gunmen shot dead five civilians in Yahukimo, Papua.
  - Indonesia recorded its highest daily increase of COVID-19 to date, with 20,574 positive cases.
- 28 June – Regent of Mamberamo Raya Dorinus Dasinapa was arrested for alleged embezzlement of COVID-19 aid and funds.

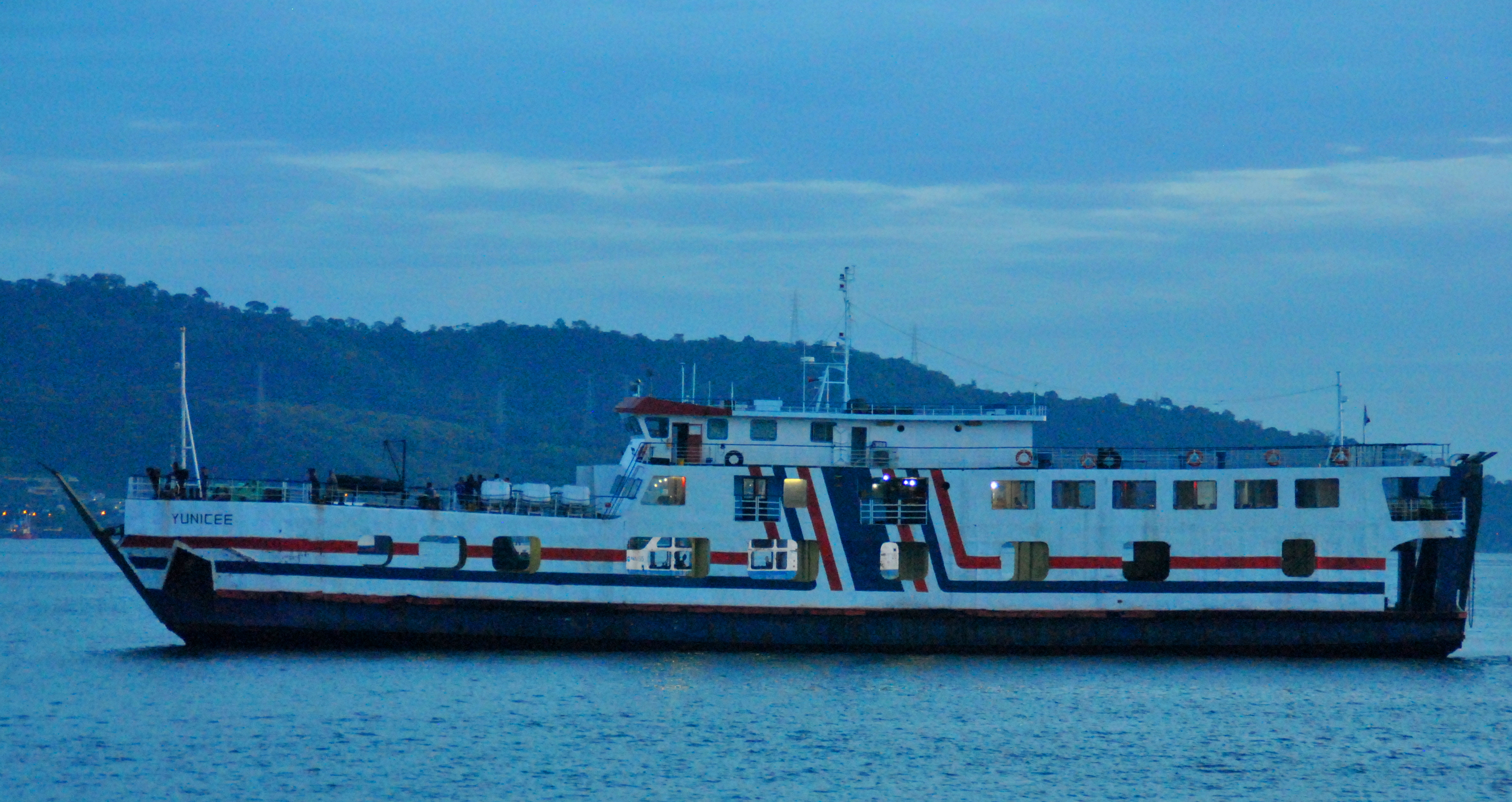
MV Yunicee capsized off the coast of Bali on 29 June while carrying 76 passengers and crews.

- 29 June – A passenger ferry, MV Yunicee, carrying 76 passengers and crew members sank while docking at Gilimanuk at Bali. At least seven people were killed and 18 people missing.

=== July ===
- 1 July – President Joko Widodo announced two weeks island-wide lockdown in Java and Bali after record surge of COVID-19 cases throughout the country.
- 3 July
  - LaporCovid19 reports that Indonesian healthcare facility has collapsed as surge in COVID-19 cases causes high BOR across multiple healthcare facilities.
  - Spokeswoman of the Indonesian Ministry of Health denied reports that multiple healthcare facilities across Indonesia had collapsed due to surging COVID-19 patients.
- 4 July
  - Oxygen shortages were reported across 5 provinces in Indonesia.
  - Official at Yogyakarta's Dr. Sardjito Hospital reported the death of 33 patients, including non-COVID-19 patients, due to oxygen shortage.
  - Government to bar unvaccinated arrivals after COVID-19 cases skyrocketed across Indonesia.
- 8 July – Number of deaths due to COVID-19 passed 1,000 cases, first time since the pandemic began in the country.
- 12 July – At least 8 were killed after a bus crash in Pemalang, Central Java.
- 13 July – Government postponed plan to sell private COVID-19 vaccine after harsh criticisms from parliamentarians and public.
- 14 July – Indonesia becomes the epicentre of COVID-19 outbreak in Asia as the country's newest daily infections overtakes India.
- 15 July – Search and rescue personnel were deployed after 14 vessels carrying fishermen capsized during a storm off the coast of Pontianak, West Kalimantan. At least 9 were killed and more than 40 people were missing.

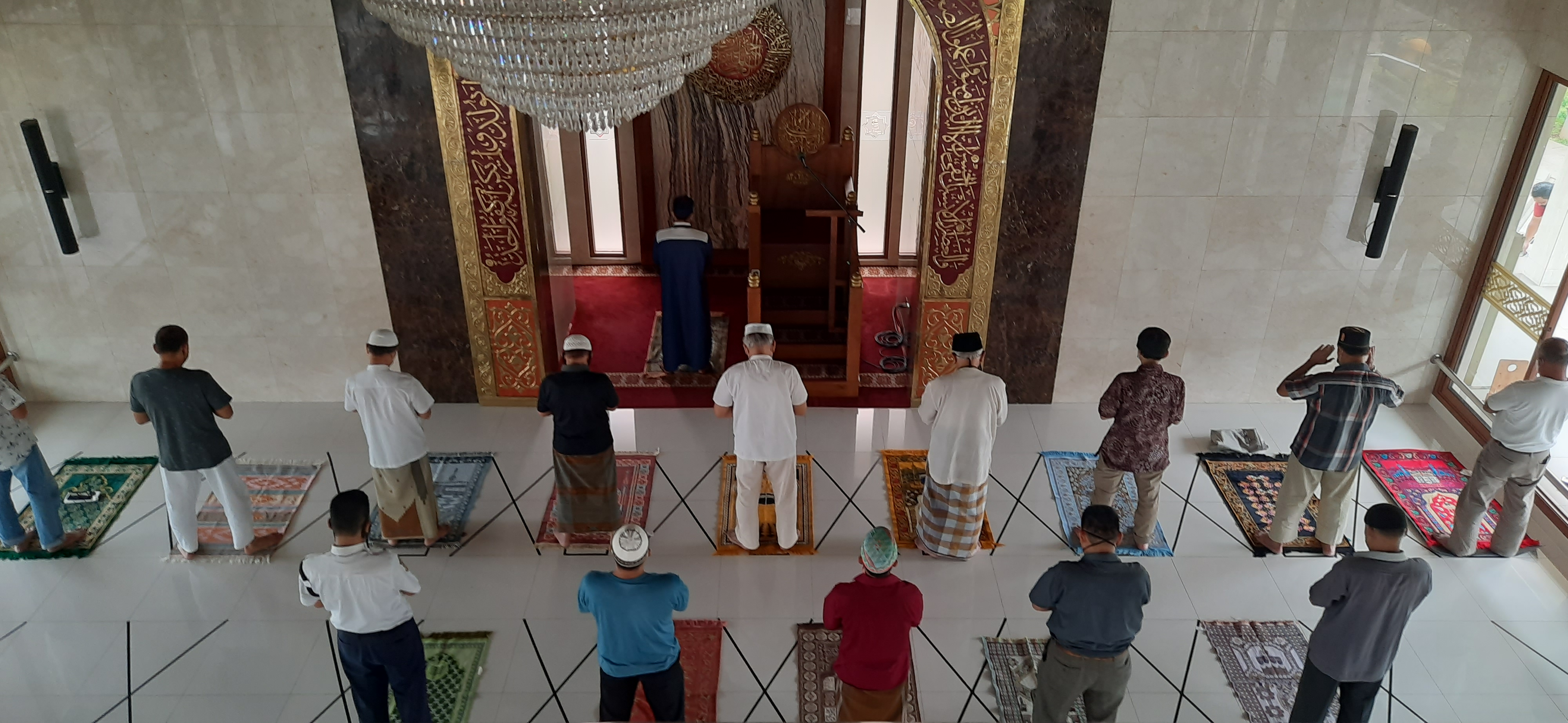
Indonesian government enforces strict social restrictions in multiple public settings after massive surge of COVID-19 cases

- 16 July – Government decided to extend emergency public activity restrictions (PPKM Darurat) for an additional 11 days after surge in COVID-19 cases.
- 22 July – Number of confirmed COVID-19 cases reached 3 million, the highest in Southeast Asia.
- 25 July – Indonesia to extend PPKM until 2 August after rise in COVID-19 cases.
- 27 July – Number of daily COVID-19 deaths in Indonesia reached 2,000 for the first time since the start of the pandemic.

=== August ===
- 1 August – Committee of UNESCO World Heritage Site urged the Indonesian government to stop tourism projects in Komodo National Park after perceived threats to the surrounding ecosystem.
- 2 August – Indonesia wins its first gold medal in badminton Women's Doubles during the 2020 Tokyo Olympics.
- 3 August – PPKM to be extended until 9 August.
- 9 August – Coordinating Minister of Maritime Affairs and Investment Luhut Binsar Pandjaitan announced that PPKM in the island of Java and Bali would be extended until 16 August.
- 10 August
  - Government of Nigeria threatens to sever ties following a viral video of a possible assault on one of its diplomat in Jakarta.
  - Immigration officials gave clarification on the video, citing that the diplomat was being aggressive and had attacked officials prior to the video. The aftermath of the incident was later resolved in the Nigerian Embassy.
- 15 August – Government sent humanitarian mission to Afghanistan following Taliban's takeover of Kabul.
- 21 August
  - Indonesian government successfully evacuated a total of 26 Indonesians and 2 Afghan nationals to Jakarta.
  - Foreign Minister Retno Marsudi announces that the Indonesian diplomatic mission in Afghanistan has been moved to Islamabad, Pakistan.
- 23 August – Former Minister of Social Affairs Juliari Batubara, who was convicted for embezzlement of COVID-19 aids, was sentenced to 12 years in prison.
- 24 August
  - Protests held by Afghan refugees turned violent in Central Jakarta.
  - Government to extend PPKM until 30 August.
- 30 August – PPKM to be extended until 6 September. Social restrictions were slightly eased following decreasing number of COVID-19 infections.

=== September ===
- 2 September – Indonesia launched a probe following massive data breach of electronic Health Alert Card (eHAC) users.
- 3 September
  - Calls for greater personal data protection and regulation following leak of Joko Widodo's personal information on social media.
  - Indonesian Broadcasting Commission was under fire after a Twitter thread of alleged sexual harassment and bullying on a male employee went viral. Police decided to investigate the case following public outcry.
- 4 September – Multiple Muslim organizations voiced their condemnations following attack on an Ahmadiyya mosque in Sintang Regency, West Kalimantan.
- 6 September
  - MV Henri, a fishing vessel carrying 32 crew members was caught on fire near Tanimbar Islands, Maluku. At least 2 people were killed and 18 people were missing.
  - Indonesia recorded a positivity rate of 4.57 percent, the lowest rate since the COVID-19 pandemic began in the country in March 2020.
  - PPKM to be extended until 13 September with further relaxations on social restrictions.
- 7 September – More than 500,000 people signed a petition to bar Indonesian dangdut performer Saipul Jamil from appearing on TV following his release from prison. He had served 3 years in prison for sexual assault on a minor.
- 8 September – At least 49 inmates were killed and more than 70 others were injured after a massive fire broke out at a penitentiary in Tangerang, Banten.
- 8-16 September – The Central Kalimantan floods affected 11 regencies and cities in Kalimantan province, resulting in a state of emergency and the deaths of 2 people.
- 11 September – Bombs used for blast fishing exploded in a residential area in Pasuruan Regency, East Java. A total of 2 people were killed 2 others were wounded by the explosion.
- 15 September – A DHC-6-300 operated by Rimbun Air crashed onto a heavily forested area in Papua, killing all three crew members on board.
- 17 September – President Joko Widodo along with 6 other top officials were ruled against the Jakarta High Court for failing to ensure clean air in Jakarta, in what environmentalists called as a "landmark case".
- 18 September – Leader of East Indonesia Mujahideen, Ali Kalora, was shot dead by authorities in the mountainous regions in Parigi Moutong Regency.
- 21 September – Search and rescue team ended their search operation for 25 missing crew members following a fire aboard the fishing vessel MV Henri.
- 24 September – Deputy Speaker of People's Representative Council Azis Syamsuddin was arrested by the Indonesian Corruption Eradication Commission.

=== October ===
- 2 October – President Joko Widodo opened the 20th PON (National Sports Week) in Jayapura, Papua.
- 4 October – Violent clash ensued following the death of former regent of Yahukimo Regency, Abock Busup. The riot killed 6 while 41 people were injured. At least 52 rioters were arrested.
- 8 October
  - Toxic gas inside a sewer in Tangerang killed 5 people.
  - World Anti Doping Agency (WADA) sanctioned Indonesia for the country's non-compliance with the anti-doping code. The flag of Indonesia will not be able to be hoisted during medal ceremony. Indonesia will also not be able to host regional, continental or international sports competition due to the sanction.
- 15 October
  - Sudden flash flood struck a group of students who were exploring a river in Ciamis, West Java, drowning 11.
  - A shallow magnitude 5.1 earthquake struck the Indonesian island of Bali, killing 3 and injuring more than 70.
- 17 October – Indonesia won the 2020 Thomas Cup, the first title since 2002.
- 23 October – President Joko Widodo ordered total overhaul on the country's anti-doping agency LADI following sanction from WADA and outrage from Indonesians.
- 26 October – Two trains of Jakarta light rail transit collided in Cibubur, Jakarta during a test run. No one was killed in the incident however a conductor was wounded.

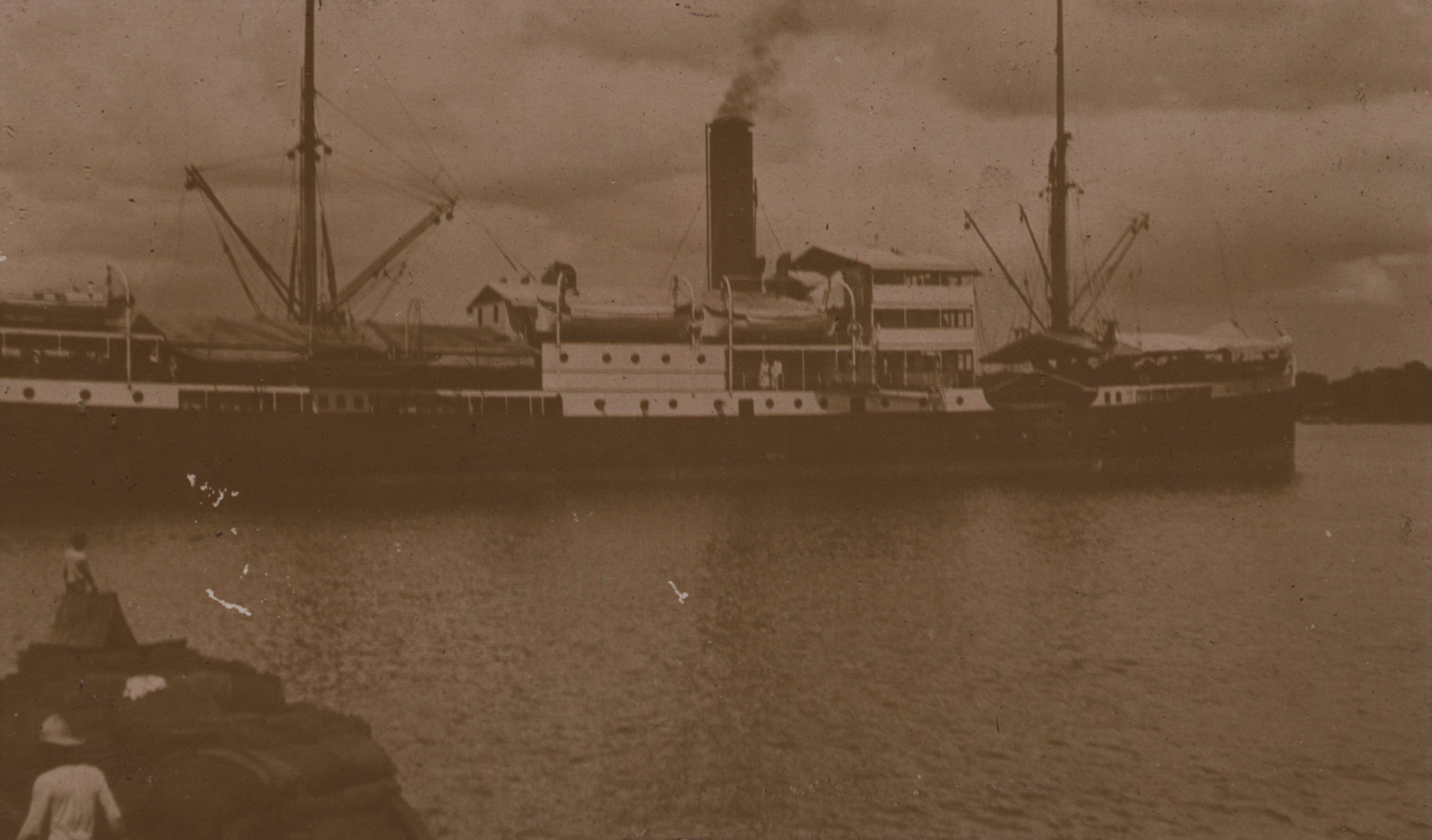
Van der Wijck, in Netherlands East-Indies, prior to its sinking

- 27 October – Team of Indonesian archeologists discovered the wreckage of the Dutch-era passenger ship Van der Wijck in Lamongan Regency, 85 years after its sinking.

=== November ===
- 4 November – At least 9 people were killed and 1 other was missing after flash flood swept the city of Batu, East Java.
- 6 November – Dean of Sriwijaya University's Social and Political Studies was accused of harassing students. The accused later threatened a Rp10 million lawsuit for defamation to the victim.
- 9 November – Islamic factions accused newly published Ministry of Education and Culture's Anti-Sexual Violence Bill as "legalizing premarital sex".
- 11 November – Police arrested Tubagus Joddy, Vanessa Angel's personal driver, following the deadly crash in Jombang-Mojokerto toll road which killed the famed actress.
- 12 November
  - President Joko Widodo officially opened the Mandalika International Street Circuit.
  - Indonesian Ulema Council declared cryptocurrency as haram.
- 24 November – Police arrested Sriwijaya University's Dean of Social and Political Studies for sexual harassment.

=== December ===
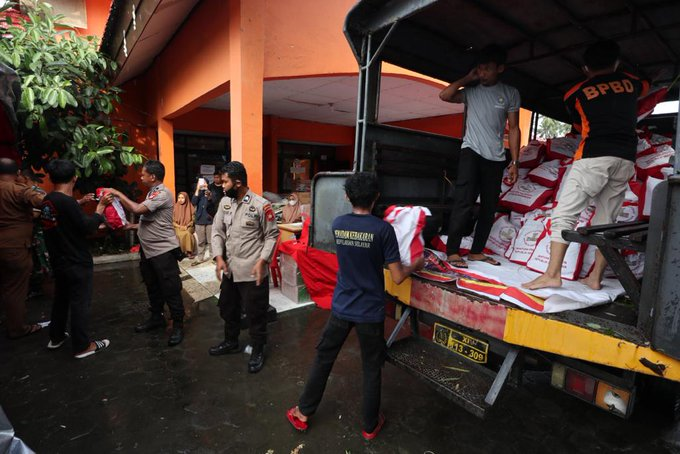
Aids distribution at a local government building following the 2021 Flores earthquake

- 1 December – Rocky Gerung and three other opposition figures were officially reported to the police for hate speech.
- 2 December – China issued protest to the Indonesian government after Indonesian authorities deployed vessels for oil and gas exploration in Indonesia's Exclusive Economic Zone in Natuna.
- 4 December
  - Sri Lelawangsa train crashes into an angkot at West Medan, killing 5 and injuring 4.
  - Mount Semeru erupted in East Java, killing dozens of people.
- 8 December – President Joko Widodo visited Sintang Regency in West Kalimantan following massive flood that had been sweeping the area for weeks.
- 11 December – Outrage following the discovery of a serial rapist inside an Islamic boarding school in Bandung.
- 14 December - More than 800 houses were destroyed and another 1,200 were damaged following a major 7.3 earthquake off the coast of Flores, East Nusa Tenggara. At least one person was killed and dozens injured.
- 15 December – Authorities confirmed the first case of the highly transmissible COVID-19 Omicron variant.
- 16 December - At least 4 people were injured and dozens of homes were damaged following a shallow 5.1 earthquake in Jember, East Java.
- 27 December – Three members of the Indonesian Armed Forces were arrested following the death of a couple in Nagreg. The bodies of both lovers had been discovered by authorities in Serayu River in Central Java.
- 28 December – Health ministry confirmed the first locally transmitted case of the Omicron variant in Indonesia.
- 30 December - At least 2 houses were destroyed following a deep 7.3 magnitude earthquake in Maluku.
- 31 December - Ministry of Energy and Mineral Resources issued a ban on coal export due to fears of a supply crisis. The ban is set no6 take effect on 1 January and will stay for at least a month.

== Deaths ==
=== January ===
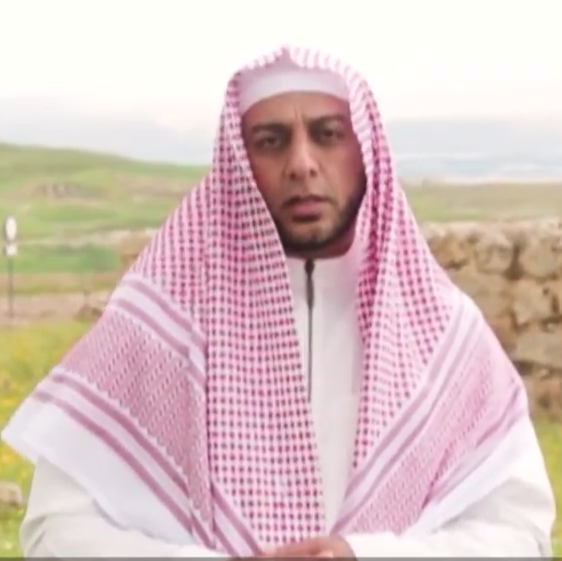
Sheikh Ali Jaber

- 1 January – Ishak Pamumbu Lambe, clergyman of the Toraja Church and politician (born 1946).
- 2 January –
  - Alex Asmasoebrata, auto racer and politician (born 1951).
  - Subiakto Tjakrawerdaya, politician, Minister of Cooperatives and Small Business (born 1944).
- 3 January – Ali Taher, politician, MP (born 1961).
- 4 January – Bambang Suryadi, politician, Member of the People's Consultative Assembly (born 1968).
- 14 January –
  - Sjarifuddin Baharsjah, academic and politician, Minister of Agriculture (born 1931).
  - Sheikh Ali Jaber, Islamic da'i (born 1976).

=== February ===
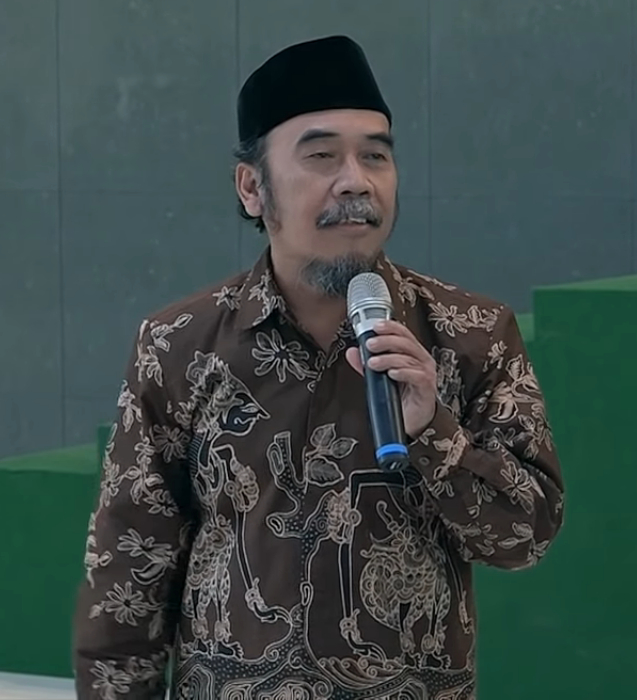
Prie GS

- 1 February – Soraya Abdullah, actress (b.1978).
- 12 February – Prie GS, journalist and writer (b.1965)
- 14 February – Sinyo Harry Sarundajang, politician (b.1945).

=== March ===
Basrief Arief

- 2 March – Rina Gunawan, actress and presenter (b.1974).
- 8 March – Kuryana Azis, politician, regent of Ogan Komering Ulu (born 1952).
- 21 March – Muchtar Pakpahan, lawyer and labor activist (b. 1953).
- 23 March – Basrief Arief, prosecutor, attorney general (born 1947).
- 25 March – Rais Abin, soldier and diplomat (b. 1926).

=== April ===
- 6 April – Daniel Dhakidae, academic and author (b. 1945)
- 8 April – Mahyuddin N. S., politician and academic (b. 1947)
- 18 April
  - Albert Papilaya, boxer (b.1967)
  - Adiguna Sutowo, businessman (b.1958)

=== May ===
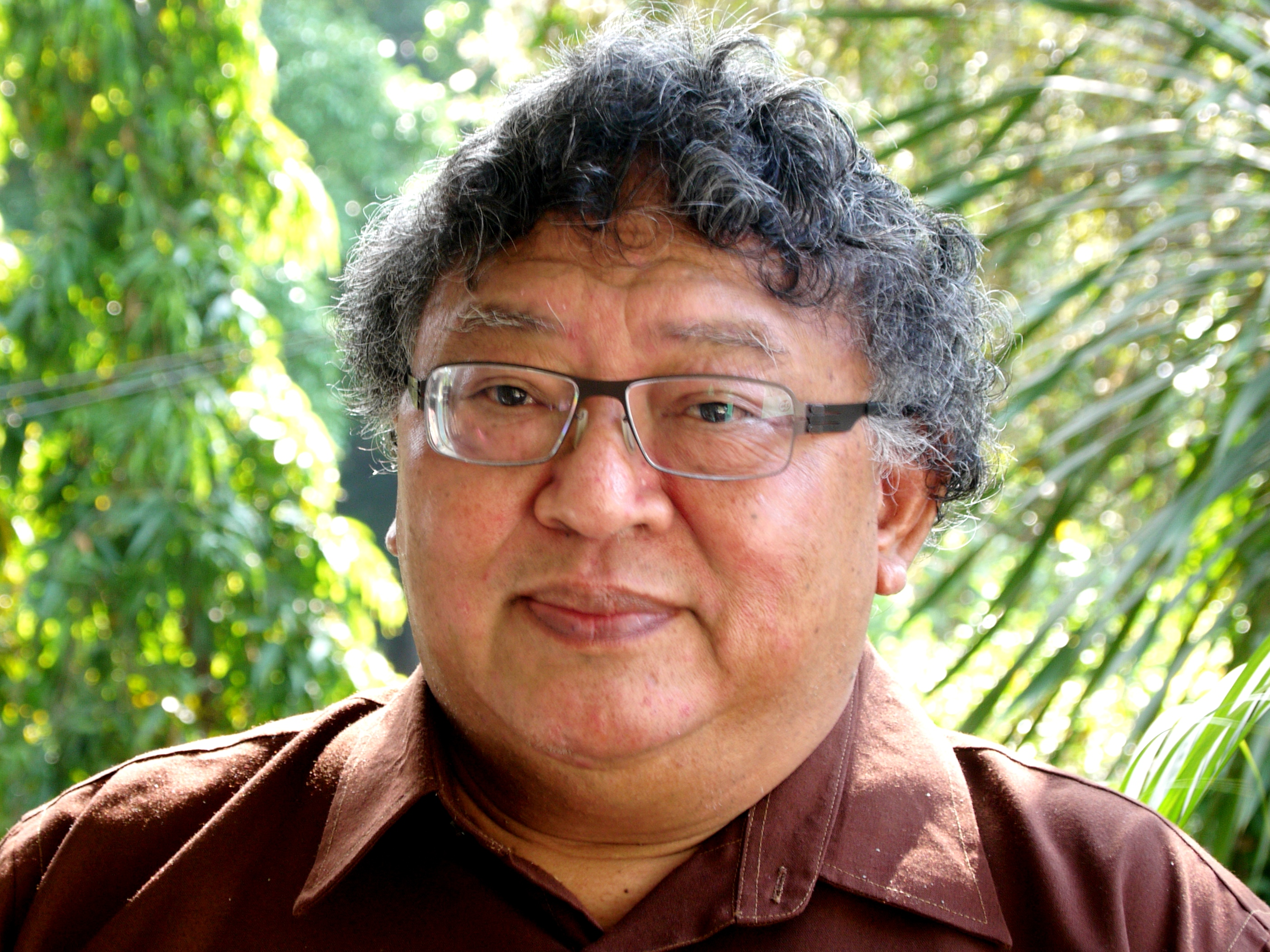
Wimar Witoelar

- 10 May – Tengku Zulkarnain, Muslim cleric (b.1963)
- 19 May – Wimar Witoelar, former government spokesman (b.1945)

=== June ===
- 6 June – Mochtar Kusumaatmadja, former minister (b.1929)
- 9 June – Helmud Hontong, vice regent of Sangihe Islands Regency (b.1962)
- 14 June – Markis Kido, athlete (b.1984)
- 18 June – Fuad Alkhar, actor (b.1959)
- 28 June – Edy Oglek, actor and comedian (b.1966)
- 29 June – Aria Baron, guitarist (b.1970)

=== July ===
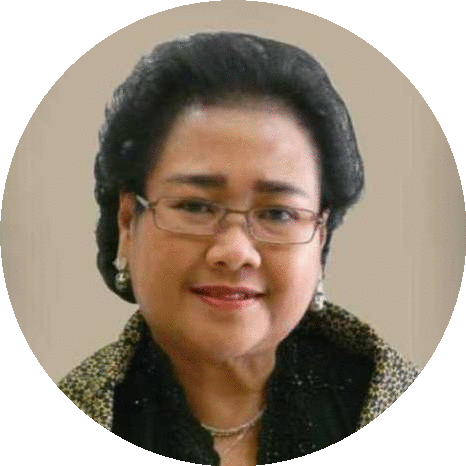
Rachmawati Soekarnoputri

- 2 July – Manteb Soedharsono, puppet master (b.1948)
- 3 July – Rachmawati Sukarnoputri, Politician (b.1950)
- 4 July
  - Jane Shalimar, actress and politician (b.1980)
  - Adang Sudrajat, politician (b.1962)
  - Harmoko, former minister (b.1939)
  - Burhan Abdurahman, politician (b.1956)
- 5 July – Beben Jazz, jazz musician and badminton player (b.1967)
- 11 July – Eka Supria Atmaja, politician, vice-regent (2017–2019) and regent of Bekasi (since 2019) (b.1973)
- 13 July – Muhammad Basyir Ahmad Syawie, former mayor of Pekalongan (b.1953)
- 15 July – Sugiharto, politician, Minister of state-owned enterprises (2004–2007) (b.1955)
- 18 July – Muhammad Idris S, politician (b.1954)
- 22 July – Christianto Wibisono, business analyst (b.1945)

=== August ===
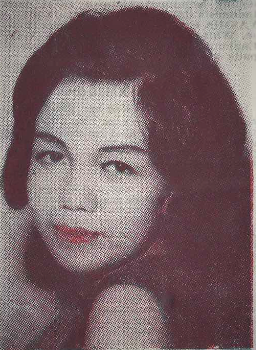
Elly Kasim

- 1 August – Yasin Payapo, Regent of West Seram (2017–2021) (b.1956).
- 2 August – Santosa Doellah, entrepreneur (b.1941)
- 3 August – Soerjadi Soedirdja, Minister of Home Affairs (1999–2001), military general (b.1938).
- 6 August – Muhammad Amin, Deputy governor of West Nusa Tenggara (2013–2018) (b.1960).
- 7 August – Akhudiat, poet, playwright, humanist (b.1946).
- 9 August – Ken Zuraida, actress, film producer (b.1954).
- 13 August – Mangkunegara IX, Duke of Mangkunegaran (b.1951).
- 18 August – Muhammad Alim, Judge of Indonesian Constitutional Court (2008–2015) (b.1945).
- 19 August – Percha Leanpuri, politician (b.1986)
- 21 August – Budi Darma, writer (b.1937).
- 25 August
  - Elly Kasim, singer (b.1944)
  - Achmad Maschut, politician, Mayor of Kediri (1999–2009) (b.1940).

=== September ===
- 5 September – Awang Ferdian Hidayat, politician (b.1975).
- 7 September – Koes Hendratmo, singer (b.1942).

=== October ===
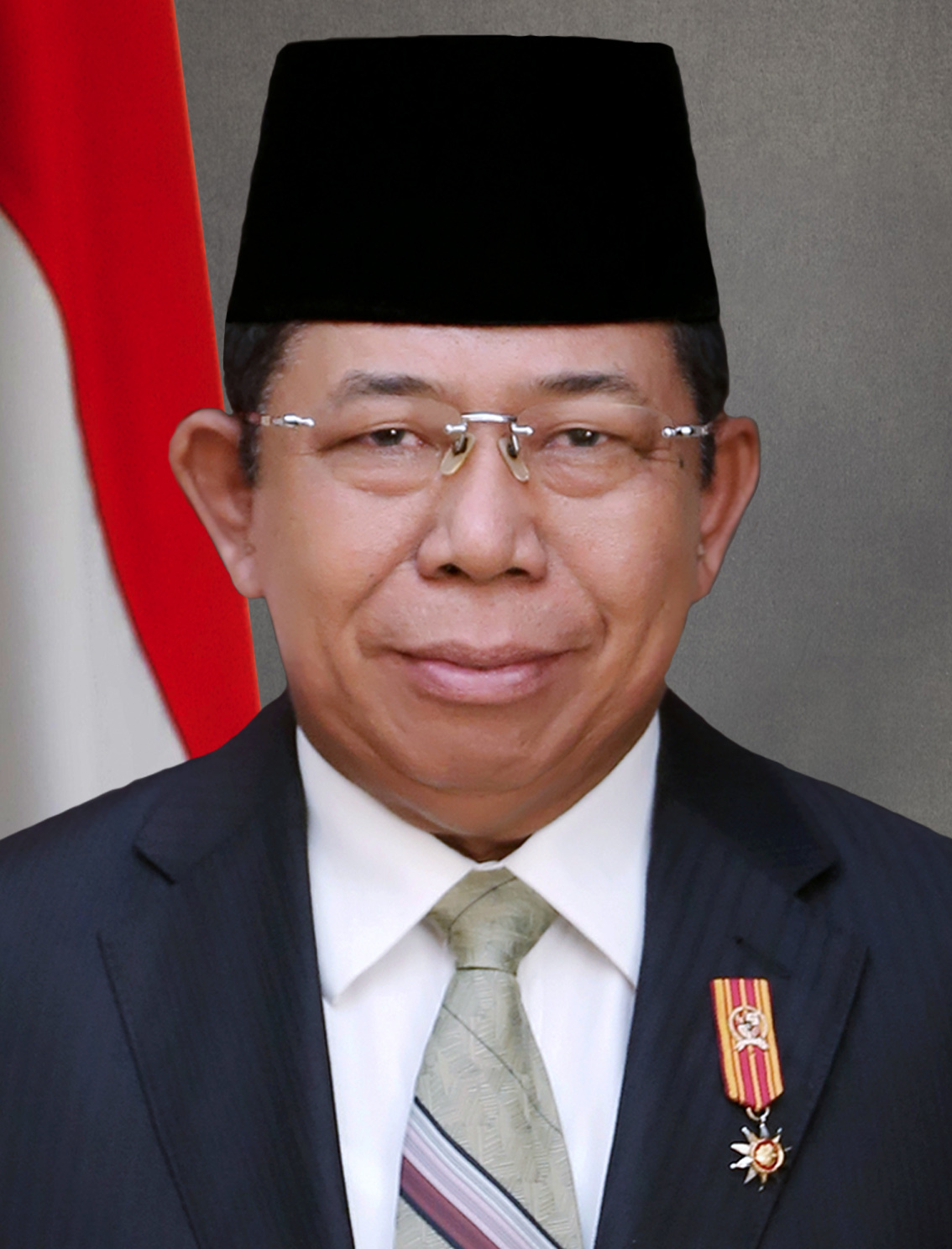
Sudi Silalahi

- 6 October – Gunawan Maryanto, author, film director (b.1976)
- 22 October – Nabiel Makarim, Minister of Environment (2001–2004) (b.1945)
- 24 October – Muhammad Hudori, Secretary-General of the Ministry of Home Affairs (2020–2021) (b.1968)
- 25 October – Sudi Silalahi, politician, former Indonesian Secretary of State (2009–2014) (b.1949)

=== November ===
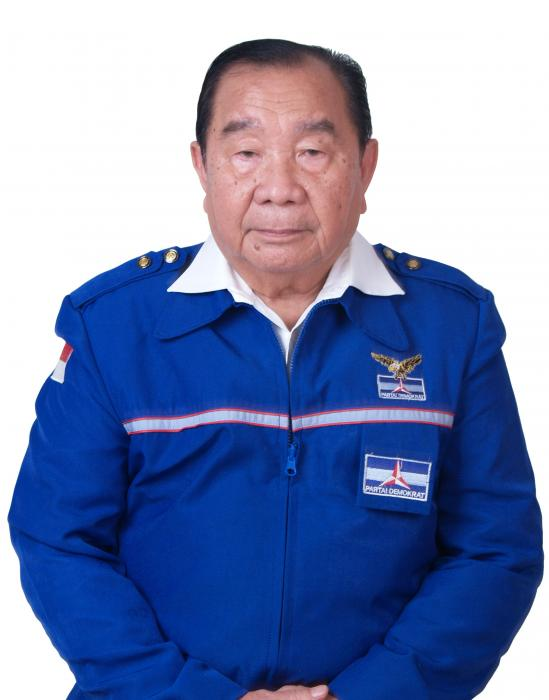
Abdul Wahab Dalimunthe

- 3 November
  - Hanna Kirana, actress (b.1998)
  - Julie Sutardjana, writer (b.1922)
  - Amiruddin Inoed, Regent of Banyuasin Regency (2002 - 2003) (b.1943)
- 4 November – Vanessa Angel, actress and singer (b.1991)
- 8 November - Abdul Wahab Dalimunthe, politician (b.1939)
- 11 November
  - Agus Hamdani, politician (b.1970)
  - Rony Dozer, comedian (b.1975)
- 17 November - Max Sopacua, sportscaster (b.1946)
- 21 November
  - Leane Suniar, archer (b.1938)
  - Verawaty Fadjrin, badminton player (b.1957)
- 29 November - Bens Leo, journalist (b.1952)

=== December ===
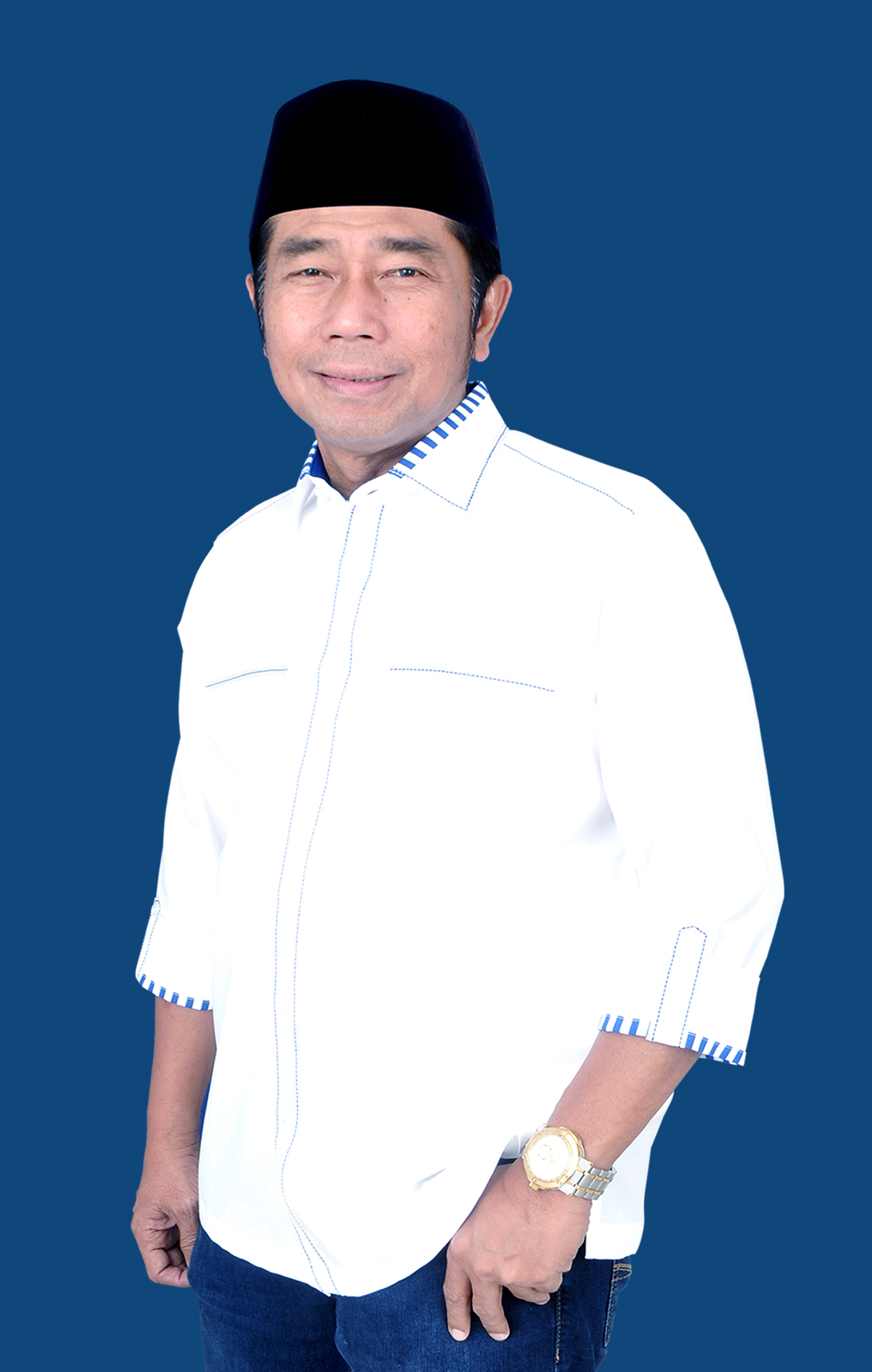
Abraham Lunggana

- 1 December - Moeslim Kawi, journalist (b.1935)
- 2 December - Poedjono Pranyoto, Governor of Lampung (1988 - 1997), Deputy Speaker of the Indonesian People's Consultative Assembly (1997 - 1999) (b.1936).
- 4 December - Idang Rasjidi, musician (b.1958)
- 10 December - Oded Muhammad Danial, mayor of Bandung (2018 - 2021) (b.1962)
- 14 December - Abraham Lunggana, politician (b.1959)
- 17 December - Yudhi Wahyuni, 3rd mayor of Banjarmasin (2005 - 2010) (b.1955).
- 18 December - Harry Azhar Azis, politician (b.1956)
- 19 December - Frans Lebu Raya, 8th Governor of East Nusa Tenggara (2008 - 2018) (b.1960)
- 23 December - Zubir Amin, politician (b.1939)
- 26 December - Jimmy Gideon, actor and comedian (b.1963)
