= Murni =

Murni is an Indonesian surname. Notable people with the surname include:

- Hari Nur Cahya Murni (born 1961), Indonesian bureaucrat
- Sylviana Murni (born 1958), Indonesian politician
