= Daniel Dhakidae =

Indonesian intellectual (1945–2021)

- Born: Daniel Dhaki Dae; 22 August 1945; Wekaseko Toto-Wolowae, Dutch East Indies (now Indonesia)
- Died: 6 April 2021 (aged 75); Jakarta, Indonesia
- Education: Gadjah Mada University; Cornell University

Daniel Dhakidae (born Daniel Dhaki Dae; 22 August 1945 – 6 April 2021) was an Indonesian intellectual. He was the chief editor of the respected journal Prisma from 1979 to 1984. He also worked as the head of the research and development division of the newspaper Kompas from 1994 to 2006.

== Early life ==
Daniel Dhakidae was born on 22 August 1945 in Wekaseko Toto-Wolowae, Flores, in what is present-day Nagekeo Regency. According to his younger brother, Longginus Bhiadae, Daniel had been born with Dhaki Dae as his last name, but he would change it Dhakidae. During his youth, he studied philosophy, seeking to become a priest. However, Daniel was "run out of his seminary," never becoming a priest.

== Education ==
Daniel would then attend Gadjah Mada University in Yogyakarta. There, he majored in public administration and graduated in 1975. He would go on to pursue further education in the United States with the support of Benedict Anderson, attending Cornell University in Ithaca, New York. He graduated with a Master of Arts degree in political science in 1987. Four years later, Daniel would graduate from Cornell again, this time with a Doctor of Philosophy degree. His dissertation on the Indonesian media landscape titled "The State, the Rise of Capital, and the Fall of Political Journalism: Political Economy of Indonesian News Industry" received the Lauriston Sharp Prize from the Southeast Asian Program of Cornell.

== Career ==
In 1976, a year after graduating, Daniel joined the journal Prisma, going on to become its chief editor from 1979 to 1984. As chief editor, he ran the journal with a "combination of astute judgement and perseverance." He had also been a supporter of the New Order regime, but later grew to dislike its repression, corruption, and propaganda. After his return from the United States, Daniel worked for the newspaper Kompas as head of its research and development division from 1994 to 2006. He had previously criticized Kompas for being part of the New Order's development vision.

He would also write several important works, aside from his well received thesis, such as Cendekawan dan Kekuasa dalam Negara Orde Baru (transl. Intellectuals and Power in the New Order State, 2003) and Social Science and Power in Indonesia which he co-edited with Vedi R. Hadiz. Both books have since become required reading for Indonesian political science students.

== Death ==
On the morning of 6 April 2021, Daniel died in MMC Kuningan Hospital. According to his family, he had suffered a heart attack the previous evening.
