= 2021 Central Kalimantan floods =

Floods in Kalimantan, Indonesia

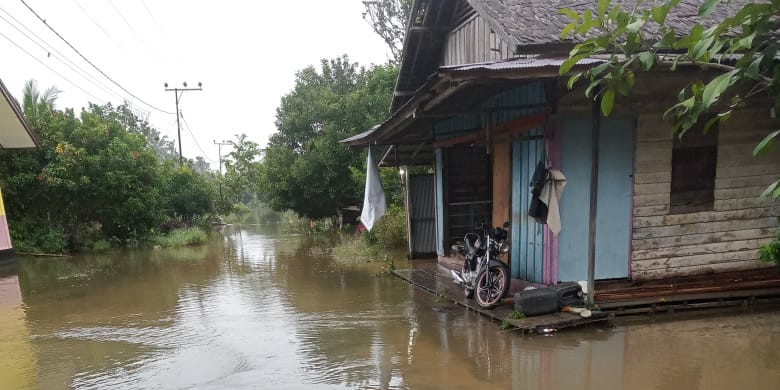
- Flood in Katingan Regency, Central Kalimantan
- Date: September 2021
- Location: Central Kalimantan
- Deaths: 2 (indirectly from electric shock)

A series of severe floods affected the province of Central Kalimantan, Indonesia on early September 2021. The floods have affected 11 regencies and cities in the province, and as of 10 September six have declared a state of emergency. The Central Kalimantan government also declared a 15-day state of emergency starting on 8 September. Katingan Regency has been particularly affected by the floods.

Road connections were cut off by the floods, and electricity was deliberately shut off by Perusahaan Listrik Negara, the state-owned electric company, to avoid civilian casualties from electric shock. Around 25,000 people have been affected by the floods and two died in Katingan Regency from electric shock. The floods are considered to be much worse than usual yearly flooding caused by overflow of Kapuas River, as well as longer in duration. Due to most roads being flooded, many people have used boats and rafts to travel around or transport their cars and motorcycles, causing demand for boat taxi service to rise. As the result, price of picking a boat taxi rise up to between Rp 100,000,- to Rp 300,000,-, far above its usual price. Katingan Regency Resort Police has urged owners of boats to avoid setting prices too high during the floods. Prices of groceries such as chicken meat, fish, and vegetables rose in Sampit due to isolation caused by roads being cut off by the flood. Road between city of Palangka Raya and town of Buntok in South Barito Regency were also cut off, trapping many cars and trucks.

The flood also began to affect the city of Palangka Raya, particularly in Jekan Raya and Pahandut district. The flood hampered daily economic activities in the city, resulting in many stores owned by city residents to be closed. Several have taken refuge in Panarung subdistrict. On 10 September, the mayor of the city declared a state of emergency. Due to continuous high-intensity rain and overflow of Kahayan River, some city residents that refused to take refuge started to contract illness. As the result, city government has to set up free emergency healthcare posts. Floods in the city is reportedly to be as deep as one meter. It also caused clean water crisis as parts of city's electricity has been cut off, making electric pumps which most of city's residents relied on could not be used.

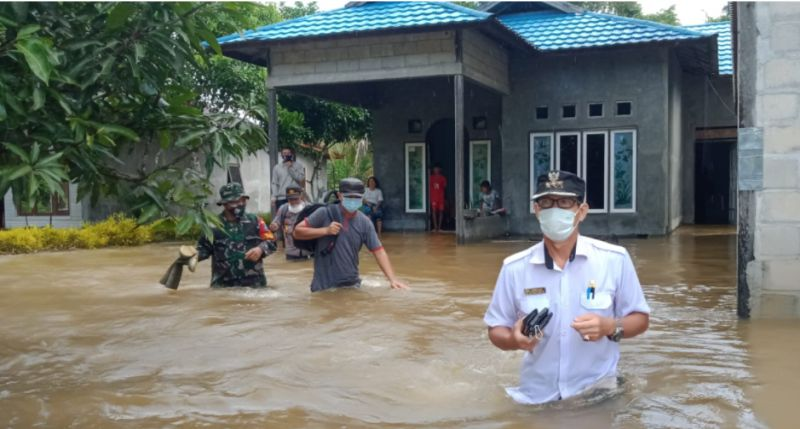
A house affected by floods in Katingan Regency

The Indonesian government with National Board for Disaster Management had begun distributing aids and evacuating people in the affected regions. Many environmentalist organizations and activists cited environmental destruction and deforestation in the province as the main cause of the flood. Governor of Central Kalimantan Sugianto Sabran said the cause of the flood was logging from designated industrial forest areas in his province.

The South Kalimantan government dispatched personnel to assist affected regions as a sign of solidarity, as many people of Central Kalimantan helped and donated to victims of 2021 South Kalimantan floods in early February.

On 16 September, Ministry of Social Affairs, Tri Rismaharini visited the city and affected regions. During her visit on several public kitchens, she received complaints that they have not yet received aid from Minister of Social Affairs. She stated soon they will begun distributing aid to affected families.
