= Max Sopacua =

Indonesian sportscaster and politician (1946–2021)

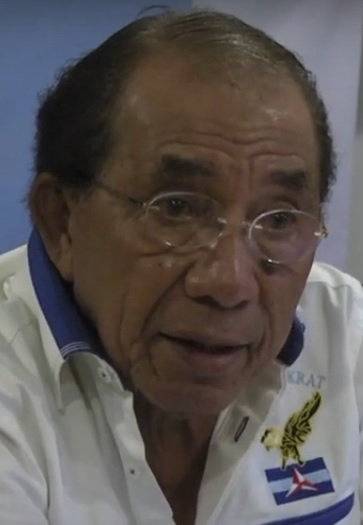
- Sopacua in 2019

Member of the People's Representative Council
- In office 1 October 2004 – 1 October 2014
- Constituency: Jawa Barat IV; Jawa Barat V

Personal details
- Born: 2 March 1946 Ambon Island, Dutch East Indies
- Died: 17 November 2021 (aged 75) Jakarta, Indonesia
- Party: Democratic Party

Max Sopacua (2 March 1946 – 17 November 2021) was an Indonesian sportscaster and politician. A member of the Democratic Party, he served in the People's Representative Council from 2004 to 2014.
