= Adang Sudrajat =

Indonesian doctor and politician (1962–2021)

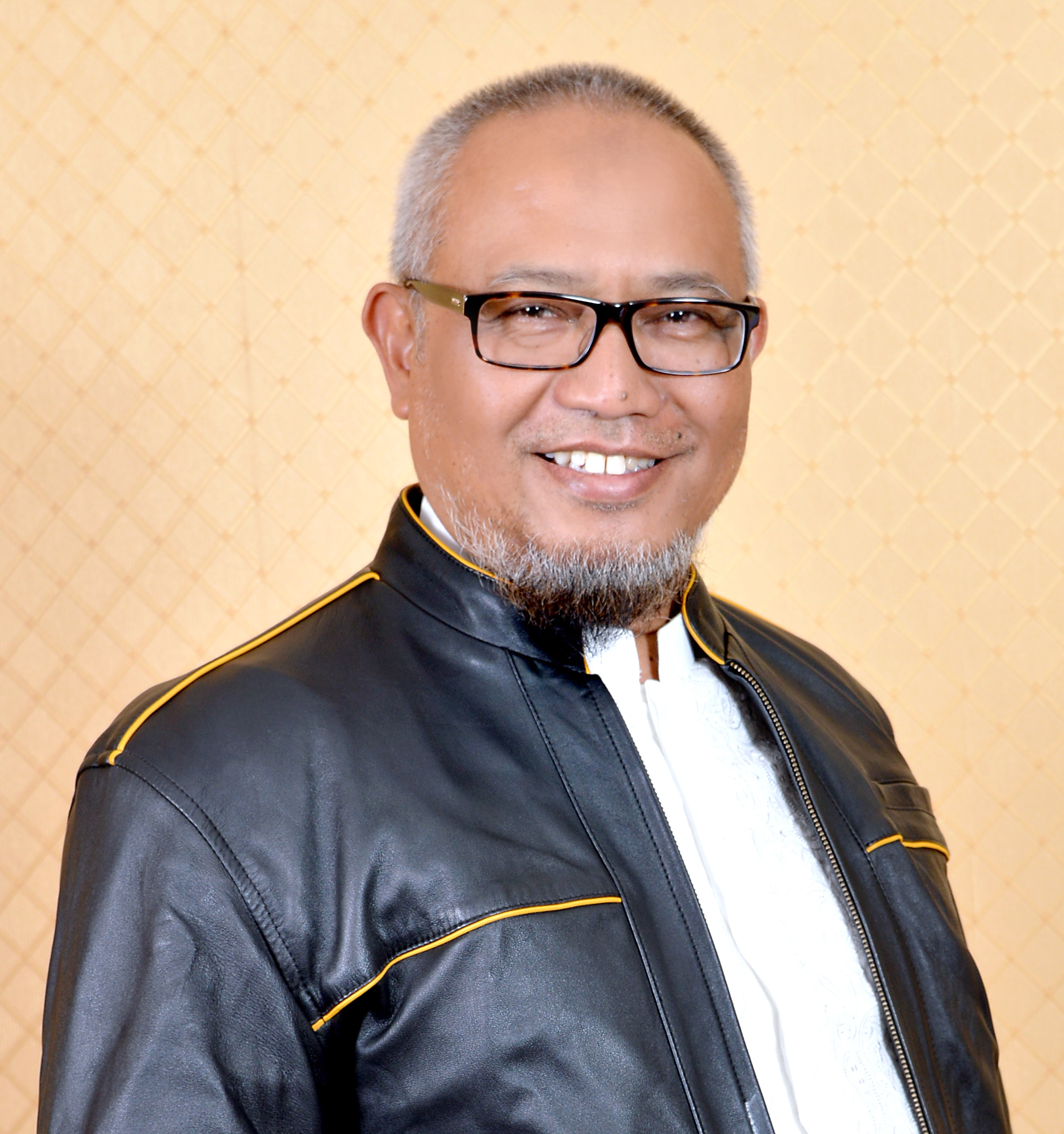

Member of the People's Representative Council
- In office 4 June 2015 – 4 July 2021
- Constituency: West Java II

Member of the Bandung Regional People's Representative Council
- In office 5 August 2004 – 12 January 2007

Personal details
- Born: 23 October 1962 Cidolog, Ciamis, Indonesia
- Died: 4 July 2021 (aged 58) Edelweiss Hospital, Bandung, West Java, Indonesia
- Party: Prosperous Justice Party
- Spouse: Evelina Dewi
- Education: Padjajaran University; Telkom Management and Business Academy

Adang Sudrajat (23 October 1962 – 4 July 2021) was an Indonesian medical doctor and elected official for the Prosperous Justice Party in the People's Representative Council (DPR-RI) and Bandung city council. His second term in the DPR-RI ended abruptly due to his death from COVID-19 in July 2021.

== Early life and education ==
Adang was born in Ciamis, a regency in the West Java province, on 23 October 1962. He attended the No. 5 Janggala Elementary School from 1969 until 1975. He moved to Tasikmalaya shortly after and entered the No. 1 Tasikmalaya Junior High School on the same year. He graduated from the junior high school in 1978 and returned to Ciamis afterwards. In 1981, he completed his high school education and entered the medical faculty of the Padjajaran University, where he studied until he graduated in 1987.

== Medical career ==
Adang moved to Aceh a year after his graduation from the university and became the head of the emergency department at the Aceh Langsa Hospital. Three years into his job at this hospital, Adang decided to return to West Java. He then became the deputy director of the human resources department at the Al Islam Hospital, a local hospital in the capital of West Java. After he was rotated through various posts, he became the deputy director of several departments in the hospital.

== Political career ==
=== In the Prosperous Justice Party ===
Adang entered politics following the fall of Suharto in 1998, when he joined the newly formed Prosperous Justice Party. He was chosen as the chairman of the party's Bandung branch shortly afterwards. He held the chairmanship for a brief period; the following year, he became a member of the executive council of the party's West Java branch.

=== Legislative career ===
Adang was elected as a member of the Bandung city council in the 2004 Indonesian legislative election. Along with other council members, he was sworn in on 5 August 2004. Less than two years later, on 4 May 2006, Adang filed a resignation letter to the council. He officially resigned after being approved by the Governor of West Java on 12 January 2007.

Several years later, Adang decided to run in the 2014 Indonesian legislative election as a candidate for the People's Representative Council. Although he was not elected as an MP, he obtained the second highest number of votes in the West Java II electoral district. He was therefore put forward as the replacement of MP Ma'mur Hasanuddin, the candidate with the highest number of votes in West Java II, who died on 6 April 2015. His nomination was approved and Adang was installed as a member of the People's Representative Council on 4 June 2015.

Adang decided to run again for a second term in the People's Representative Council. He was elected to the council and became one of seven members of the council with a medical background. He was seated in the Commission IX of the People's Representative Council, which handles demographic affairs, health, manpower and transmigration.

== Death ==
On 30 June 2021, Adang was brought to the Edelweis Hospital in Bandung after being diagnosed as COVID-19 positive. He died in the hospital on 4 July 2021.
