= Muhammad Hudori =

Indonesian bureaucrat (1968–2021)

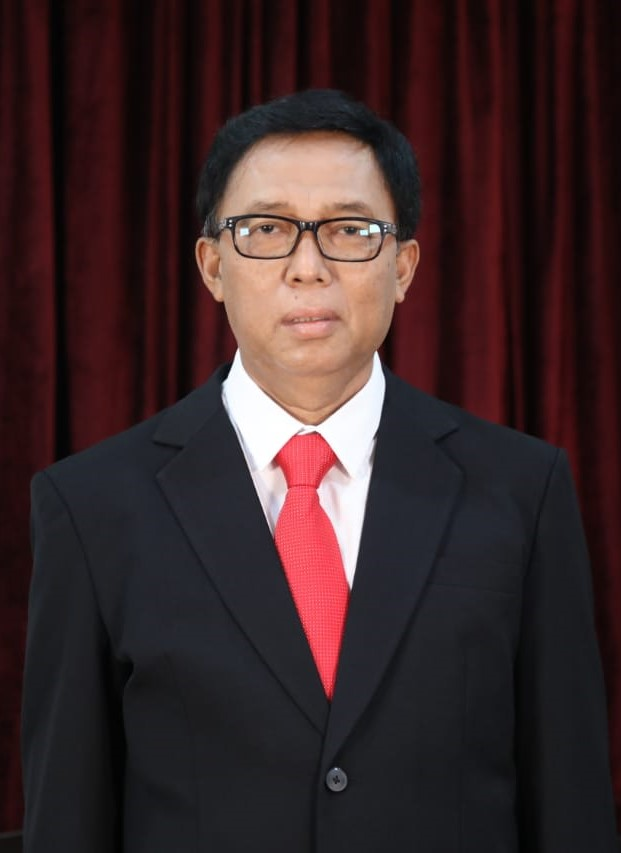
- Hudori in 2021

Secretary-General of the Ministry of Home Affairs
- In office 23 March 2020 – 24 October 2021
- Preceded by: Hadi Prabowo
- Succeeded by: Suhajar Diantoro (acting)

Director-General of Regional Development
- In office 19 February 2019 – 27 July 2020
- Preceded by: Muhammad Marwan
- Succeeded by: Hari Nur Cahya Murni

Personal details
- Born: 5 April 1968 Pandeglang Regency, Indonesia
- Died: 24 October 2021 (aged 53) Jakarta, Indonesia

Muhammad Hudori (5 April 1968 – 24 October 2021) was an Indonesian bureaucrat and politician. He served as Secretary-General of the Ministry of Home Affairs from 2020 to 2021.

Following his death on 24 October 2021, Minister of Home Affairs Tito Karnavian appointed Suhajar Diantoro, an expert staff in the ministry, to replace him in an acting capacity. The inauguration took place two days after his death.
