= Burhan Abdurahman =

Indonesian politician (1956–2021)

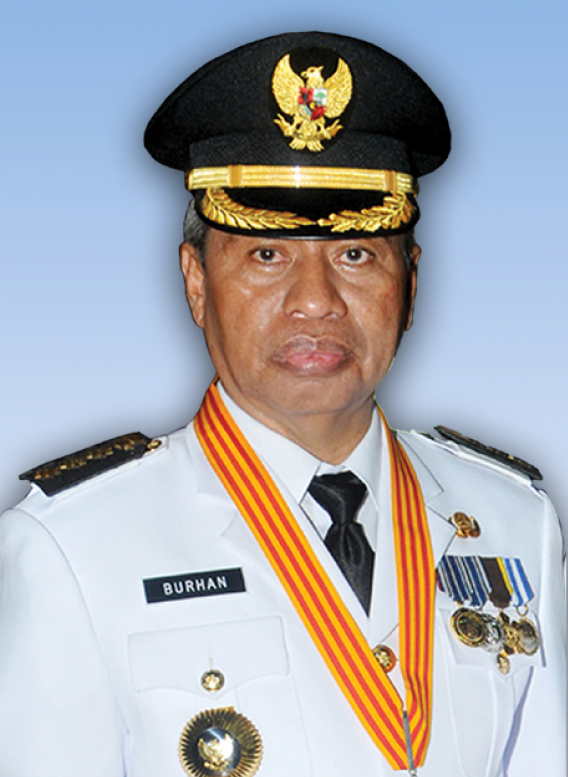

Mayor of Ternate
- In office 17 February 2016 – 17 February 2021
- Preceded by: Idrus Assagaf
- Succeeded by: Yusuf Sunya
- In office 10 August 2010 – 10 August 2015
- Preceded by: Syamsir Andili
- Succeeded by: Idrus Assagaf

Personal details
- Born: 1 December 1956 Ternate, Indonesia
- Died: 4 July 2021 (aged 64) Makassar, Indonesia

Burhan Abdurahman (1 December 1956 – 4 July 2021) was an Indonesian politician.

== Biography ==
He served as the 2nd Mayor of Ternate from 2010 to 2021. He died in Makassar on 4 July 2021 at the age of 64 from COVID-19.
