= Ishak Pamumbu Lambe =

Indonesian politician (1946–2021)

Rev. Ishak Pamumbu Lambe
- Born: 6 February 1946; Tana Toraja Regency, South Sulawesi, Indonesia
- Died: 1 January 2021 (aged 74); Elim Rantepao Hospital, Indonesia
- Education: Johannes Gutenberg University, Mainz
- Occupations: Christian Pastor, Politician
- Office: Senator
- Spouse: Hermin Sangka' Palisungan
- Children: 2

Rev. Ishak Pamumbu Lambe (6 February 1946 – 1 January 2021) was an Indonesian Torajan Christian pastor and politician. He served as a senator in the national Regional Representative Council from 2004 to 2009. Lambe was also the former chairman of the Toraja Church Synod Worker's Agency, a Protestant denomination headquartered in the Tana Toraja Regency of South Sulawesi, from 1992 to 2001.

== Biography ==
Lambe was born on 6 February 1946, in Tana Toraja Regency, present-day South Sulawesi. He graduated from Rantepao Christian Junior High School in Tana Toraja in 1962. He then attended Rantepao Christian SPG until 1965. Lambe graduated from Theologia College (STT) (Sekolah Tinggi Theologia STT), a theological seminary in Jakarta, in 1971 before completing his master's degree at the same seminary from 1976 to 1978. Lambe later received his doctorate from Johannes Gutenberg University in Mainz.

Lambe worked as a teacher at STT Rantepao from 1 January 1973, until September 1983. He was then appointed pastor of the Labuang Baji Church in Makassar from 1 September 1983 to 1988. Lambe was next appointed as a permanent lecturer at the STT Intim Makassar school.

Lambe served as the chairman of the Communion of Churches in Indonesia in South and Southeast Sulawesi from 1989 to 1994 and the chair of MPH PGI from 1994 to 1999. In 1992, Lambe was elected the chairman of the Toraja Church Synod Workers Agency (BPS), a position he held from 1992 until 2001. In 2001, he was elected the General Secretary of the national Communion of Churches in Indonesia (PGI).

In 2013, Rev. Lambe was elected chairman of the board of directors of Lembaga Alkitab Indonesia (LAI), or Indonesia Bible Institute, a position he held until his death in 2021.

Ishak Pamumbu Lambe died at Elim Rantepao Hospital just after midnight on 1 January 2021, at the age of 74. His death was confirmed by the Deputy Regent of Tana Toraja Regency, Yosia Rinto Kadang. Lambe was survived by his wife, Hermin Sangka' Palisungan, and their two children. He was buried in Rantetayo, Tana Toraja Regency, on 1 January 2021.
