= Alex Asmasoebrata =

Indonesian auto racer and politician (1951–2021)

Member of the People's Consultative Assembly
- In office 1 October 1992 – 1 October 1997
- President: Suharto
- Parliamentary group: Regional Delegation (Indonesian Democratic Party)
- Constituency: Jakarta

Personal details
- Born: 23 June 1951 Jakarta, Indonesia
- Died: 2 January 2021 (aged 69) Jakarta, Indonesia
- Party: Democratic Party
- Other political affiliations: Indonesian Democratic Party of Struggle (1999—2003); Indonesian Democratic Party (1973—1999)

M.A.S. Alex Asmasoebrata (23 June 1951 – 2 January 2021) was an Indonesian politician and auto racer. Born from a politician father, Asmasoebrata pursued his education in Jakarta. Asmasoebrata started his career as an auto racer in 1975 and competed in the Johor Grand Prix in 1988. Asmasoebrata also joined the Indonesian Democratic Party and held his first political office as Jakarta's Regional Delegate to the People's Consultative Assembly. Asmasoebrata died due to pancreatic and heart cancer.

== Early life and education ==
Alex Asmasoebrata was born on 23 June 1951 in Jakarta, Indonesia as the son of Ipik Asmasoebrata and Mirna Lilie Herani. His father, Ipik Asmasoebrata, was a politician from the Indonesian National Party and Indonesian Democratic Party who served in the People's Representative Council for two terms.

He graduated from the South Jakarta Elementary School in 1964, from the Jakarta State Junior High School No. 13 in 1967, Jakarta State High School No. 13 in 1970, and the Corporate Leadership Academy in 1980.

After Alex Asmasoebrata pursued his career as an auto racer, he enrolled at several auto racing courses. Asmasoebrata studied at the Brands Hatch Racing School in 1982 and at the Perth Fast Lane Racing Driver School in 1992. One of his classmates during his study in Perth was Ananda Mikola.

== Racing career ==
Asmasoebrata began his career as an auto racer since 1975. Alex, alongside his brother Ferry Asmasoebrata, competed in the Johor Grand Prix '88.

In October 1987, Asmasoebrata challenged Indonesian motorcycle racer Aswin Bahar on a Santana automobile vs motorcycle race, nicknamed the Scooby Doo Race, in Ancol Circuit on 25 October 1987. A year later, Asmasoebrata faced Bahar again at the Pancasila Yotuh Astoria Race III on 13 February 1988. However, on the day of the race, Asmasoebrata withdrew from the race. His reason was he wanted to give younger auto racers a chance to compete in the race.

== Political career ==
Asmasoebrata joined the Indonesian Democratic Party after the party's formation in 1973. Asmasoebrata was elected as the chairman of the party's branch in Jakarta in 1989.

Asmasoebrata's first office nomination occurred in 1991 when he became the candidate for the Jakarta Regional People's Representative Council from the Indonesian Democratic Party. Although Asmasoebrata won a seat and nominated for the deputy chairman's seat, Asmasoebrata refused to be inaugurated. Nevertheless, Asmasoebrata attended the inauguration on 25 July 1992 as an observer. His vacant seat was filled a year later on 7 April 1993 by Imam Sutikno.

Asmasoebrata stated that his resignation was due to the loss of the party in Jakarta at the 1992 Indonesian legislative election. He stated that he wanted to focus on reforming the party's branch in Jakarta. Meanwhile, Suryadi, the chairman of the Indonesian Democratic Party, stated that Asmasoebrata's resignation was a common thing in politics. Suryadi then gave examples of past chairmen in Central Java and East Nusa Tenggara who refused a seat in the provincial council.

As an exchange, the Jakarta Regional People's Representative Council offered him a seat as Jakarta's Regional Delegation to the People's Consultative Assembly. He accepted the offer and was inaugurated on 1 October 1992 for a five-year term.

After the restrictions of the political parties were lifted, the Indonesian Democratic Party of Struggle — formerly a faction within the Indonesian Democratic Party — was formed. Asmasoebrata joined the party in 1999, but left three years later in favor of the Democratic Party. Asmasoebrata joined Susilo Bambang Yudhoyono's presidential campaign team in 2004 and 2009. Asmasoebrata was nominated by the party as a member of the People's Representative Council for the West Java IX constituency in the 2014 Indonesian legislative election, but failed to win any seats.

In 2019, Asmasoebrata declared his endorsement for Prabowo Subianto in the 2019 Indonesian general elections. Asmasoebrata joined the Prabowo Subianto 2019 presidential campaign team as a member.

== Death ==
Prior to his death, Asmasoebrata was diagnosed with pancreatic and heart cancer. He was treated in his house until his death. During his treatment, Governor Anies Baswedan and Vice Governor Sandiaga Uno paid a visit. Asmasoebrata died in Dr. Cipto Mangunkusumo Hospital at 00.10 am on 2 January 2021.
