= Hari Nur Cahya Murni =

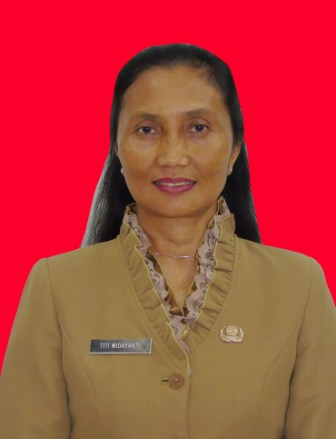

Acting Governor of Jambi
- In office 18 February 2021 – 7 July 2021
- President: Joko Widodo
- Preceded by: Fachrori Umar; Sudirman (acting)
- Succeeded by: Al Haris

Director General of Regional Development
- In office 27 July 2020 – 26 October 2021
- President: Joko Widodo
- Preceded by: Muhammad Hudori
- Succeeded by: Sugeng Haryono (acting)

Personal details
- Born: 30 November 1961 (age 64) Kutoarjo, Purworejo, Central Java, Indonesia

Hari Nur Cahya Murni (born 30 November 1961) is an Indonesian bureaucrat who currently serves as the director general of regional development and acting governor of Jambi.

== Early life ==
Murni was born on 30 November 1961 in Kutoarjo, Purworejo. She graduated from the Lambung Mangkurat University with an economy management degree in 1985, University of Indonesia with a degree in environmental studies in 1995, and the IPB University in 2000 with a cum laude predicate. She also obtained her doctorate from the latter.

== Bureaucratic career ==
Murni started her career in the Ministry of Home Affairs after her graduation from the Lambung Mangkurat University. Murni reached the second echelon in the ministry after becoming the director for Regional-Owned Enterprises, Regional Public Service Agency, and Regional Property on 1 October 2016. She initially became the director under acting tenure, before being promoted to a definitive officeholder. She was later promoted to the first echelon on 19 February 2019 as the minister's expert staff for society and interagency affairs.

=== Director general of regional development ===
After serving as expert staff for a year, Murni became the director general of regional development on 27 July 2020 under Minister Tito Karnavian. Murni retired on 25 October 2021 and was replaced by Sugeng Haryono, an expert staff in the ministry, in an acting capacity a day later.

=== Acting governor of Jambi ===
Murni became the acting governor of Jambi on 18 February 2021. She became the first female to held the office, albeit in acting capacity.

== Personal life ==
Murni was married to Norman Muhdad.
