= Akhudiat =

Indonesian poet (1946–2021)

- Born: 5 May 1946; Rogojampi], Banyuwangi, East Java, Indonesia
- Died: 7 August 2021 (aged 75); Surabaya, East Java, Indonesia
- Occupation: Writer
- Children: Ayesha, Andre Muhammad, and Yasmin Fitrida
- Writing career
- Language: Indonesian
- Subject: Literature
- Notable work: Masuk Kampung Keluar Kampung

Akhudiat (5 May 1946 – 7 August 2021) was an Indonesian poet, playwright, and humanist.

== Biography ==
Akhudiat was born in Rogojampi, Banyuwangi, East Java, in a farmer's family in the village of Karanganyar, District Rogojampi, Banyuwangi. He married Mulyani on 4 November 1974, and had three children, namely: Ayesha (born in 1975), Andre Muhammad (born in 1976), and Yasmin Fitrida (born in 1978).

During the early years of his education, Akhudiat attended the School of the People (Sekolah Rakyat) in Rogojampi, Banyuwangi, and graduated in 1958. He continued school at the First Religious Affairs of Teacher Education (PGAPN) IV Jember, from where he graduated in 1962. Then, he went to school in Malang, while teaching at several junior/high schools, and madrassas. Akhudiat gained a diploma in 1965 from the State Islamic Education (Phin) III Yogyakarta. In 1965, he also joined Acting Course Theater Muslim in Yogyakarta. During the years 1972 to 1973, he joined the Academy of Journalists Surabaya (AWS), but did not complete his course. Akhudiat also took courses in English at the Indonesian Institute of America (LIA), Soetomo Surabaya, up to advanced level. In 1992, he earned his bachelor's degree from the Open University (UT), Faculty of Social Sciences (FISIPOL). As a poet, Akhudiat, also went to pursue the International Writing Program at the University of Iowa, U.S. for six months, where he studied language and theater.

In 1970, after the completion of formal higher education, Akhudiat was appointed a civil servant in the Central Office of the State Islamic Institute (IAIN), Sunan Ampel Surabaya. The last position that Akhudiat led was the Head of Student Affairs, Central Office IAIN Sunan Ampel Surabaya, from which he retired in 2002. From his retirement year until present, he has served as a Lecturer at the Faculty of Extraordinary Adab IAIN Sunan Ampel Surabaya. He has also served on the Committee on Literature and the Arts Council Theatre in Surabaya during the years 1972 to 1982, owing to his distinct activism in the arts and culture, especially literature and theater. He has remained a member of the plenary on the Arts Council of East Java (DKJT), from 1999; served on the steering committee of the Surabaya Art Festival (FSS) from 2000 to the present. In 2002, from 10 to 22 October, Akhudiat attended an international program wherein he "Visits Artists" - Cultural East Java to Bangkok, Kuala Lumpur, and Singapore, for cultural performances and seminar programs.

Until recently, Akhudiat served as an Outstanding Lecturer for introducing Research, Culture and History of Islamic Art at the Faculty Adab, IAIN Sunan Ampel, Surabaya. He has also been an active member of various professional organizations, such as the Jakarta Art Council from 1972 to 1982, Script writer and director of the Youth Theater workshop in 1972, and the Arts Council of East Java from 1998 to 2003.

He has received many honors and commendations for his services: Governor of East Java Province, an award for performing artists (2001); Mayor activists of modern theater (1989); RE, won the prize in writing contest drama, Jakarta Arts Council (1977); Bui, won the prize in writing contest drama, Jakarta Arts Council (1975); Honorary Fellow in the International Writing Program, University of Iowa, USA (1975); Jaka Tarub, roofless house, won the Writing contest prizes in drama, the Board Jakarta Art (1974); Graffito (text of the play), won the prize in Writing contest drama, Arts Council Jakarta, Surabaya (1972).

Akhudiat has to his credit a long list of translated works, such as: Malapetaka (2002) from Catastrophe, by Samuel Beckett; Fred (2001) from Fred by Sherwood Anderson; Kursi – kursi (1999) from The Chairs by Eugene Ionesco; Jalan Tembakau (1992) from Tobacco Road by Erskine Caldwell; Laboratorium Gila (1991) from One Flew Over The Cuckoo's Nest by Dale Wasserman, Ken Kesey; Anak yang Dikubur (1990) from The Buried Child by Sam Shepard; Raja Ubu (1976) from Ubu Roi by Alfred Jarry; Bak Pasir (1976) from The Sandbox by Edward Albee.

In early 2011, Akhudiat, the script writer and theater director completed a manuscript called Ludrukan; Skolah scandal, and handed it to the Studio Merah Putih for the Surabaya Art Festival 2011.

== Publications ==
- Akhudiat (1974). Rumah tak beratap rumah tak berasap dan langit dekat dan langit sehat (in Indonesian). Jakarta: Dewan Kesenian Jakarta. OCLC 220348896.
- Akhudiat (1974). Jaka tarub : sebuah lakon parodi dua babak (in Indonesian). Jakarta: Bank - Naskah Dewan Kesenian. OCLC 219932867.
- Akhudiat (1974). Graffito; sebuah lakon sandiwara satu babak duabelas adegan (in Indonesian). Jakarta: Dewan Kesenian Jakarta. OCLC 66192105.
- Akhudiat (1975). Bui : sandiwara (in Indonesian). Jakarta: Dewan Kesenian Jakarta. OCLC 12868994.
- Akhudiat (1975). Raja Ubu : drama 5 babak (in Indonesian). OCLC 63435524.
- Akhudiat (1977). Re (in Indonesian). OCLC 63441968.
- Akhudiat (1988). Para pemangku pembaharu (in Indonesian). Surabaya: Kantor Wilayah Propinsi Jawa Timur, Departemen Pendidikan dan Kebudayaan. OCLC 68997979.
- Akhudiat (1989). Surabaya, puisi dan kita : bahan diskusi "Surabaya kotaku" (in Indonesian). Surabaya: Biro Sastra KPK Surabaya. OCLC 64015931.
- Akhudiat (1991). Generasi muda dan cipta budaya (in Indonesian). Jakarta: Panitia Kongres Kebudayaan. OCLC 65921346.
- Akhudiat (1995). Improvisasi retak : antologi puisi penyair 7 kota (in Indonesian). Surabaya: Kelompok Seni Rupa Bermain. OCLC 68744194.
- Akhudiat (2000). Memo putih : antologi puisi 14 penyair Jawa Timur (in Indonesian). Surabaya: Komite Sastra Dewan Kesenian Jawa Timur. OCLC 67271689.
- Akhudiat (2008). Masuk kampung keluar kampung : Surabaya kilas balik (in Indonesian). Surabaya, Indonesia: Henk Publica. ISBN 978-979-25-2974-6. OCLC 318534195.
