= Zubir Amin =

Indonesian diplomat (1939–2021)

Indonesia Ambassador to Turkey
- In office 1982–1984

Indonesia Ambassador to Madagascar
- In office 1979–1982

Personal details
- Born: 26 July 1939 Pariaman, Dutch East Indies
- Died: 23 December 2021 (aged 82)

Zubir Amin (26 July 1939 – 23 December 2021) was an Indonesian politician. He served as Indonesia's ambassador to Madagascar from 1979 to 1982 and to Turkey from 1982 to 1984. Amin died on 23 December 2021, at the age of 82.
