= Vedi R. Hadiz =

Indonesian political sociologist

Academic background
- Education: Universitas Indonesia, Murdoch University

Academic work
- Main interests: Political Sociology, Political Economy, Asian Studies
- Notable works: Localising Power in Post-Authoritarian Indonesia A Southeast Asia Perspective; Reorganising Power in Indonesia: The Politics of Oligarchy in an Age of Markets

Vedi R. Hadiz is an Indonesian political sociologist. He is known for research on the political economy of development, oligarchic power, and the relationship between religion and politics, with a particular focus on Indonesia and comparative cases in Southeast Asia and the Middle East.

He is Professor of Asian Studies at the Asia Institute and a Redmond Barry Distinguished Professor at the University of Melbourne. He has held senior leadership roles at the university, including Director of the Asia Institute.

== Early life and education ==
Hadiz studied at the University of Indonesia and completed a PhD at Murdoch University in 1996.

== Academic career ==
Hadiz has held academic appointments in Australia and Singapore. This includes the appointments at Murdoch University’s Asia Research Centre, the National University of Singapore, as well as his later move to the University of Melbourne.

He is an elected Fellow of the Academy of the Social Sciences in Australia and has been profiled by the Academy in coverage of research recognition lists, describing his field as political economy and political sociology with a focus on Indonesia and Southeast Asia.

== Research ==
Hadiz's research has explored the organisation and reproduction of political and economic power in post-authoritarian contexts. The idea that institutional reforms—including decentralisation initiatives that are frequently marketed as "good governance"—should be examined as part of larger social power dynamics rather than as essentially technical policy design is a recurrent theme in published scholarly discussions of his work.

His book Localising Power in Post-Authoritarian Indonesia: A Southeast Asia Perspective (2010) develops this argument through case-based analysis of local political dynamics after the fall of Indonesia’s New Order regime. In a review in Social Forces, the book’s main contribution is described as a critique of “technical” understandings of decentralisation that overlook entrenched power relations and the persistence of pre-reform political forces after 1998. A review in Bijdragen tot de Taal-,Land- en Volkenkunde discusses the book’s argument that local political competition and institutional change can reproduce older elite configurations rather than necessarily displacing them.

Hadiz is also known for work on oligarchy and political economy in Indonesia, including co-authored research on the reorganisation of elite power after the fall of Suharto. A review of Reorganising Power in Indonesia: The Politics of Oligarchy in an Age of Markets (2004, with Richard Robison) in International Relations of the Asia-Pacific (Oxford Academic) treats the book as a major intervention in debates about Indonesia’s post-authoritarian political economy.

A later strand of his scholarship compares trajectories of Islamic politics and populism across regions. In a review, Islamic Populism in Indonesia and the Middle East (2015) is described as a comparative study of Islamist mobilisation across Indonesia and selected Middle Eastern cases, emphasising political-economic and historical explanations over ideological accounts.

=== Labour and class politics ===
Labour has been a recurring theme in Hadiz's work. His first book, Workers and the State in New Order Indonesia (1997), based on his doctoral thesis at Murdoch University, examined the emergence of an industrial working class under the New Order. In a review for Pacific Affairs, Ozay Mehmet described the book as detailing how the suppression of workers' rights had been a systematic state policy aimed at maintaining Indonesia's attractiveness to foreign investment. He noted that it analysed the politics of labour in a late-industrialising country through three models of state–capital–labour accommodation (social democratic, populist and exclusionary), with the exclusionary model presented as the most applicable to Indonesia, and that it traced the New Order's political exclusion of labour to a development strategy shaped by the regime's hostility to the Indonesian Communist Party. Mehmet also highlighted the book's discussion of how working-class identity emerges in a society undergoing rapid industrial transformation, and its account of the growing militancy of the labour movement after 1990. He characterised its conclusions as "generally pessimistic, but not fatalistic", noting that Hadiz saw the approaching end of the Suharto regime as a possible "window of opportunity" for independent labour organising.

Following the fall of Suharto, Hadiz wrote on the prospects for labour under Reformasi. Benny Hari Juliawan has discussed Hadiz's analysis of the fragmentation and political weakness of organised labour after 1998, while arguing that street protest had nonetheless become a routine form of political engagement for Indonesian workers. Hadiz has also co-authored research with Ahmet Bekmen and Ferit Serkan Öngel on labour, nationalism and Islam in Turkey and Indonesia. In a 2025 article, he argued that labour subordination in Indonesia has become intertwined with state nationalism and Islamic discourse, limiting the labour movement's influence on democratisation. In a 2023 essay with Diatyka Widya Permata Yasih on app-based motorcycle taxi drivers, he argued that drivers' self-perception as independent entrepreneurs, together with religious community networks, tended to encourage accommodation to precarity rather than collective demands for labour rights.

=== Political economy and oligarchy ===
Reorganising Power in Indonesia has been viewed as an intervention in discussions on post-authoritarian political economy in reviews and subsequent scholarly discourse, emphasising how entrenched politico-business interests can shape political and market institutions rather than displacing them. The book was also reviewed in a Foreign Affairs capsule after it was published.

In Indonesian studies, the Hadiz and Robison "oligarchy" approach has been the subject of much discussion. In a symposium titled "Beyond Oligarchy?" published in the journal Indonesia, competing conceptualisations of oligarchy and material inequality in Indonesian politics and society were discussed. More recent scholarly commentary has examined the "oligarchy framework" as a significant point of reference in discussions concerning the relationship between political power and economic resources (the "wealth-rulership nexus") in various Indonesian institutions.

In 2026 Hadiz and Robison published a revised and expanded second edition of Reorganising Power in Indonesia, retitled Oligarchy and the End of Reformasi in Indonesia: Power Reorganised, which extends the analysis to the presidencies of Joko Widodo (Jokowi) and Prabowo Subianto. The publisher describes the book as arguing that "democratic politics, populist impulses, and oligarchic domination can ultimately co-exist and sustain one another". The Jakarta Post, reporting on the release, noted that the original book was regarded as "one of the most influential works on modern Indonesian politics". It summarised the authors' view that oligarchic interests, which the post-1998 reforms had left intact, had since reconsolidated, with power becoming more centralised under Jokowi and more so under Prabowo even as democratic institutions persisted.

The new edition traces this argument over a longer historical period. The authors argue that the oligarchic forces that survived Suharto did not merely adapt to the institutions created after 1998, but that their consolidation eventually contributed to a renewed concentration of political and economic power. For the authors, the "end of Reformasi" does not signify a simple restoration of the New Order: many democratic institutions remain, but operate within a substantially altered balance of social power. They argue that neither markets nor democratic institutions possess an inherent logic that progressively undermines oligarchy, and that whether democracy constrains concentrated power ultimately depends on the organisation and strength of social forces capable of using its institutions. At the book's launch in Jakarta, Hadiz argued that confronting oligarchy required strong, organised social movements with real social bases.

=== Decentralisation, state reform, and local power ===
Another strand in Hadiz’s work concerns the political sociology of state reform, especially decentralisation. Reviews have highlighted Localising Power in Post-Authoritarian Indonesia as a critique of donor- and policy-driven understandings of decentralisation and as an account emphasising the persistence and reconfiguration of entrenched political forces in local politics after 1998.

=== Political Islam and “new Islamic populism” ===
Hadiz has also written on political Islam through the lens of political economy and historical sociology. In Islamic Populism in Indonesia and the Middle East (2016), he compares Indonesia, Egypt, and Turkey and develops the concept of “new Islamic populism” to explain different trajectories of Islamist politics across contexts. A review in the Philippine Journal of Public Policy summarises this “new Islamic populism” as a cross-class mobilisation framed around the ummah and argues that the book foregrounds political-economic and historical-sociological explanations where other approaches emphasise doctrine or culture. Reviews in other journals have discussed the book in connection with wider debates on populism and political Islam.

== Selected works ==
=== Books ===
- Hadiz, Vedi R. (1997). Workers and the State in New Order Indonesia. Routledge.
- Robison, Richard; Hadiz, Vedi R. (2004). Reorganising Power in Indonesia: The Politics of Oligarchy in an Age of Markets. RoutledgeCurzon.
- Hadiz, Vedi R. (2010). Localising Power in Post-Authoritarian Indonesia: A Southeast Asia Perspective. Stanford University Press.
- Hadiz, Vedi R. (2015). Islamic Populism in Indonesia and the Middle East (PDF). Cambridge University Press.
- Hadiz, Vedi R.; Robison, Richard (2026). Oligarchy and the End of Reformasi in Indonesia: Power Reorganised (2nd ed.). Routledge. doi:10.4324/9781003618317.

=== Edited volumes ===
- Chalmers, Ian; Hadiz, Vedi R. (1997). The Politics of Economic Development in Indonesia: Contending Perspectives. Routledge.
- Bourchier, David; Hadiz, Vedi R. (2003). Indonesian Politics and Society: A Reader. RoutledgeCurzon.
- Hadiz, Vedi R.; Dhakidae, Daniel (2005). Social Science and Power in Indonesia. ISEAS/Equinox.
- Hadiz, Vedi R. (2006). Empire and Neoliberalism in Asia. Routledge.
- Khoo, Boo Teik; Hadiz, Vedi R.; Nakanishi, Yoshihiro (2014). Between Dissent and Power: The Transformation of Islamic Politics in the Middle East and Asia. Palgrave Macmillan.
