= Helmud Hontong =

Indonesian politician (1962–2021)

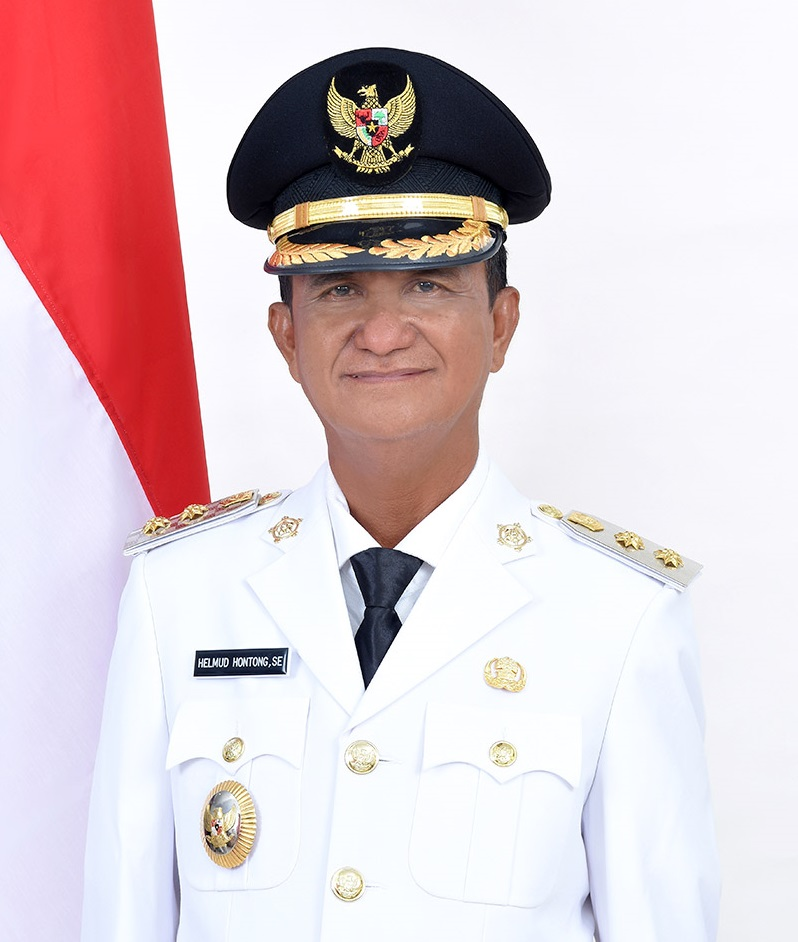
- Official portrait of Helmud Hontong as Vice-Regent

Vice Regent of Sangihe Islands Regency
- In office 22 May 2017 – 9 June 2021
- President: Joko Widodo
- Governor: Olly Dondokambey
- Regent: Jabes Gaghana

Personal details
- Born: 9 November 1962 Mahengetang, North Sulawesi
- Died: 9 June 2021 (aged 58) On flight from Denpasar–Makassar
- Spouse: Rahel Sasamu
- Children: Geral Imanuel Hontong

Helmud Hontong (9 November 1962 – 9 June 2021) was an Indonesian politician and the vice-regent of the Sangihe Islands Regency from 2017 until his sudden death on 9 June 2021 during a flight from Denpasar to Makassar. He had previously served two terms as representative in the regency's parliament from 2009 to 2017. He opposed a plan by PT Tambang Mas Sangihe to develop a gold mine in the regency and issued a formal letter to the Ministry of Energy and Mineral Resources requesting to convert the mine concession with a Community Mine on 20 April 2021.

Helmund travelled with his adjutant on a Lion Air transit flight between Denpasar to Makassar on his way to Manado. After taking off, he coughed and started bleeding from his mouth and nose. When the plane arrived in Makassar, he was declared dead by a medical team at the airport.

== Early life ==
Helmud Hontong was born on the island of Mahengetang in the Sangihe Islands on 9 November 1962. He spent most of his childhood and education in Tahuna. He finished senior high school in 1982 and continued his education, earning a Bachelor of Economics in Manado in 2004. Helmud worked as a barber; he opened a small barbershop that he later expanded to become his primary business.

== Political career ==
Helmud started to take an interest in politics when he was recruited as a hairdresser for the wife of a member of the provincial parliament in Manado, who encouraged him to run in the legislative election. In 2009, he was elected as a representative in the Sangihe Islands' parliament and re-elected in 2014 for a second term, both times for the Golkar Party. When his second term ended, Helmud decided to run as a vice-regent in 2017.

=== Vice Regency ===
In 2017, Helmud was elected vice-regent of the Sangihe Islands Regency.

=== Community gold mining ===
Helmud was strongly opposed to a proposed gold mine operated by PT Tambang Mas Sangihe and requested the mining concession instead be converted into a Community Mine, where unlicensed miners typically operate. According to government mapping of the potential mineral resource, the mine would cover 42,000 hectares (160 sq mi) of the Sangihe Islands, more than half of their area. An exploration permit had been granted in 1987 using karya (transl. creation) contract, which was a product of Suharto's New Order.

On 29 January 2021, the company was granted a 33-year-long permit for production in the region. Jabes Gaghana, however, said the mine would only cover around 60 hectares (0.23 sq mi) of land. According to the Save Sangihe Islands Movement that Indonesians organised with the financial, logistical support and participation of illegal miners or PETI to oppose the mining permit of PT Tambang Mas Sangihe, Helmud delivered a letter to the Ministry of Energy and Mineral Resources arguing the mine was against Law Number 1 of 2014 regarding mining permits in small islands and coastal regions but then argued it should be turned into a Community Mine. Jabes stated he had never seen the letter himself while confirming he was opposed to the mining permit.

In an interview on 21 April 2021, Helmud stated he strongly rejected any mining activity in the region for any reason by TMS.

I firmly reject the existence of PT Tambang Mas Sangihe operating in Sangihe. Whatever the reason. I stand with the people. Because the people who voted for me to became Vice Regent. I feel sorry for the people, our children, and grandchildren that will be victims later due to the waste from gold production. Whatever happens, I stay with the people to reject the mine.

However, Helmund did not appear to reject mining on Sangihe Island only who does it. In his formal letter to the Ministry of Energy of Energy and Mineral Resources on April 20, 2021 he wrote

3. It is requested that the mining area in Sangihe Islands Regency be made a Community Mining area

Two days after Helmund's death, the Ministry of Energy and Mineral Resources confirmed to the public his rejection letter but stated they would continue to permit the mine with government surveillance. On 12 January 2023, the mining permit was cancelled and declared as violation of the law by Supreme Court of Indonesia.

== Death ==
According to an official statement from Lion Air, Helmud and his adjutant boarded transit flight JT-740 from Denpasar to Makassar en route to Manado at 15:08 Central Indonesian Time on 9 June 2021. Previously, he attended an annual meeting between all regents and vice-regents in Indonesia. He was tested negative for COVID-19 and boarded the plane. At 15:40, not long after the take-off, the flight crew were told Helmud needed emergency medical help. Helmud suddenly coughed and bled from both his mouth and nose, having earlier asked for a drink of water after feeling discomfort in his neck. The crew obtained assistance from a licensed doctor on the flight. Helmud was given a portable oxygen tube while the crew loosened his clothes and cleaned his face, which had blood on it. The pilot was instructed to land at the nearest airport, which was the original destination Sultan Hasanuddin International Airport. At 16:17, the plane landed and he was quickly evacuated to a waiting medical team, who declared him dead.

=== Investigation ===
Helmud's adjutant refused to allow an autopsy and asked for the vice-regent's body to be taken into a nearby hospital and put into a coffin. The medical team stated, according to Suara.com, while he may have died from a heart attack, the cause of death was not clear yet and it was possible other factors were involved. Police said Helmud's family also rejected a request for autopsy in Makassar and instead asked that his body be taken right away to Manado.

According to Helmud's nephew Engel Hontong, Helmud had no history of illness and routinely checked his health; he described Helmud's death as "very sudden". Police eventually stated the suspected cause of death was a sudden heart attack. Helmud's body arrived in Manado a day later and was returned to Tahuna by ship. The Sangihe Islands' regency government ordered the national flag to be flown at half mast a day after his death. According to CNN Indonesia, the police did not explain the process conducted to conclude he died because of a heart attack.

Indonesian netizens quickly speculated about Helmud's sudden death in relation to his opposition to the gold mine. Mining Advocation Network, an Indonesian NGO that advocates for the effects of the mining industry and communities and the environment, pleaded with the Indonesian government to investigate his death. The organization described his death as "unusual and suspicious". Helmud's death became a trending topic on Indonesian Twitter, with many netizens comparing his death to that of Munir Said Thalib, an Indonesian human rights activist who was poisoned during a flight. Following Helmud's death, issues regarding the mining permit also trended with Indonesian netizens. Commission II of the People's Representative Council also urged police to investigate his death.

On 12 June 2021, North Sulawesi Regional Police and the Sangihe Islands Regency Resort Police formed a special team to investigate Helmud's death. Police chief of Sangihe Islands Regency said according to his early investigation, Helmud had a history of diabetes and asthma but stated further investigation was needed. The National Commission on Human Rights urged the police to investigate his death to clear up speculation. Greenpeace declared support for Helmud's initiative to reject the mine and offered condolences.

On 13 June 2021, police announced an autopsy team would arrive at Tahuna and would start work the next day. The following day, police announced the autopsy found Helmud had died from disease complications but refused to comment any further, saying the forensic team would explain in a press conference. Later, according to Kompas.tv and Liputan6, the forensic team said they found no trace of toxic substances in Helmud's body.
