= Agus Hamdani =

Indonesian politician (1970–2021)

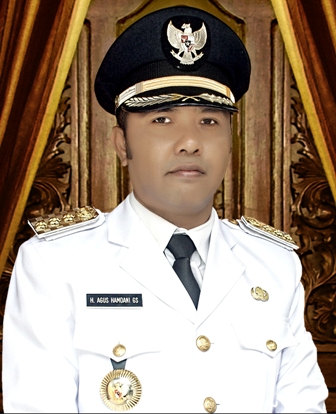
- Official portrait, 2013

Regent of Garut
- In office 25 February 2013 – 23 January 2014
- Preceded by: Aceng Fikri
- Succeeded by: Rudy Gunawan

Deputy Regent of Garut
- In office 12 June 2012 – 25 February 2013
- Preceded by: Dicky Candra
- Succeeded by: Helmi Budiman

Personal details
- Born: 4 July 1970 Bandung, Indonesia
- Died: 11 November 2021 (aged 51) Garut Regency, Indonesia
- Party: PPP

Agus Hamdani (4 July 1970 – 11 November 2021) was an Indonesian politician. A member of the United Development Party, he served as regent of Garut from 2013 to 2014 and deputy regent from 2012 to 2013.
