= 2021 South Kalimantan floods =

2021 floods in Indonesia

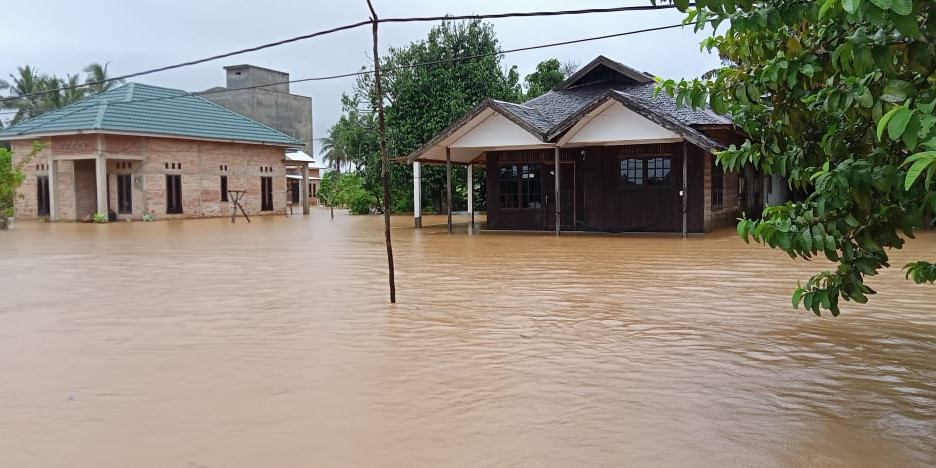
- Flood in Tanah Laut Regency
- Date: 9 January 2021 - February 2021
- Location: Most of South Kalimantan
- Deaths: 15

The 2021 South Kalimantan floods were a series of floods in the South Kalimantan province of Indonesia. It was the worst flood to affect the region in the last ten years, and the first major flood in the past fifty years. Most of the region affected had never experienced such a flood before. There were 15 deaths while many are missing. Landslides were also triggered by the floods. The most affected regions were Banjarmasin, Central Hulu Sungai Regency, and Tanah Laut Regency. More than 100,000 people were evacuated. Indonesian National Armed Forces began distributing aid to victims of the flooding in early 2021.

== Causes ==
The flood is thought to have been caused by high rainfall intensity, which triggered river overflows that began on January 9, 2021. However, the Director of Indonesian Forum for Environment for South Kalimantan, Dwi Cahyono, argued that the flood was caused by environmental degradation in the form of hundreds of mining holes that were not reclaimed and nearly fifty percent of the 3.7 million hectares of land were controlled by mining and oil palm companies.

== Criticism of government response ==
Indonesian netizens criticized lack of coverage on national media about the floods. President Joko Widodo posted on social media that Indonesia currently struggles against two natural disasters; 2021 Sumedang landslides and 2021 West Sulawesi earthquake, but did not mention the floods. Consequently, hashtag "#KalselJugaIndonesia" (South Kalimantan is also Indonesia) trended on Twitter as protest of government's lack of coverage.

Environment activists and opposition argued that floods happening in South Kalimantan were the result of uncontrolled and unsustainable investments resulting destruction of the nature, and criticized the provincial government that blamed the floods solely on weather. Later president post a video on the disaster that he already received direct report from South Kalimantan governor, Sahbirin Noor and urged all government personnel to provide aids necessary for the victims especially inflatable boat. Later, president visited the affected region directly on 18 January together with regent of Banjar Regency.

== See also ==
- List of natural disasters in Indonesia
