= Financial Sector Development and Strengthening Act =

UU Pengembangan dan Penguatan Sektor Keuangan

House of Representatives
- Long title: Undang-Undang Nomor 4 Tahun 2023 tentang Pengembangan dan Penguatan Sektor Keuangan (Law No. 4 of 2023 on Financial Sector Development and Strengthening)
- Citation: Law No. 4/2023
- Territorial extent: Indonesia
- Passed by: House of Representatives
- Passed: 15 December 2022
- Commenced: 12 January 2023

Legislative history
- Bill title: RUU Pengembangan dan Penguatan Sektor Keuangan (Bill on Financial Sector Development and Strengthening)
- Introduced by: Government of Indonesia
- Status: In force

The Financial Sector Development and Strengthening Act is an act of parliament in the form of omnibus law to develop and strengthen the Indonesian financial sector. It is proposed by the Joko Widodo administration. The law was passed by the House of Representatives on December 15, 2022.

Unlike the previous omnibus laws proposed by the Joko Widodo administration such as Omnibus Law on Job Creation, Law on State Capital, and 2023 Indonesian Criminal Code, this law is the first omnibus law made under mechanisms prescribed in the Law Formulation Act.

When the law passed, Indonesia is expected to underwent a national economy transition for the next 5 years.

== Notable regulations ==
=== Digital Rupiah ===
Article 10 of the law introduced new form of Rupiah, Digital Rupiah, as central bank digital currency of Indonesia. Digital Rupiah will exist as the third form of Rupiah along with previously known metallic Rupiah (coins) and paper rupiah (paper money). The law mandated Bank Indonesia to regulate the development, issue, and circulation of the Digital Rupiah.

=== Increasing powers of the Financial Services Authority ===
The Financial Services Authority (OJK) will have their power increased by the law. OJK will not only monitor financial services, but it will also possess power to monitor saving and loan cooperatives and cryptocurrencies.

=== Cryptocurrency ===
By this law, the Ministry of Trade's Commodity Futures Trading Regulatory Agency will no longer regulate cryptocurrency in Indonesia. The power to regulate the cryptocurrency will be vested to the OJK.

=== Insurance assurance ===
Prior the law passed, the Indonesia Deposit Insurance Corporation (LPS) did not regulate and assure the insurance. Article 53 of the law mandated the LPS to expand their assurance coverage from covering only bank savings to include the insurance covering in case the insurance company going bankrupt and have problems. LPS will assure the insurance until the new Indonesia Insurance Assurance Corporation (LPP) formed by the mandate of the law, 5 years after the law promulgated.

=== Changes to OJK and LPS structure ===
As OJK and LPS authorities increased, OJK and LPS both will have Board of Commissioners for their institutional oversight on its own, similar to Bank Indonesia structure.

=== Status of Bank Indonesia, OJK, and LPS ===
By the law, Bank Indonesia, OJK, and LPS established as completely independent body and free from political influence. Article 56 of the law asserted that no politicians ever allowed to hold the Governor and Board of Commissioners of Bank Indonesia, OJK, and LPS.
