= Masyumi Party (2020) =

Masyumi Party Partai Masyumi
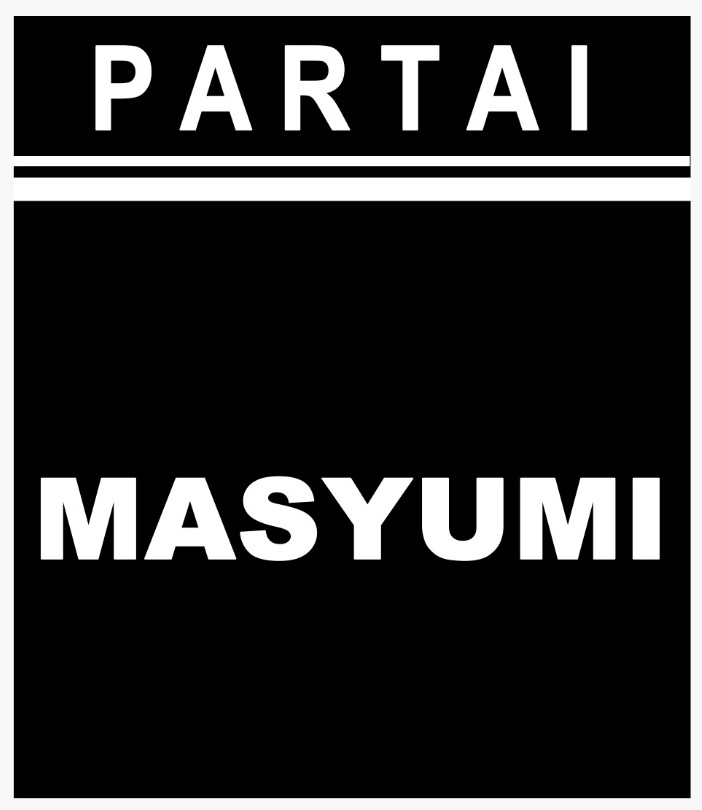
- General Chairman: Ahmad Yani
- Secretary-General: TB. Massa Djafar
- Founded: 7 November 2020; 5 years ago
- Headquarters: Jakarta, Indonesia
- Ideology: Islamism
- DPR seats: 0 / 580
- DPRD I seats: 0 / 2,372
- DPRD II seats: 0 / 17,510

Website
- https://partaimasyumi.id/

The Masyumi Party originally known as the Masyumi Reborn Party is an Islamist extremist political party founded in Indonesia on November 7, 2020. The party was founded by Ahmad Yani, leader of the Action for Rescuing Indonesia Coalition. The party claimed to be a spiritual successor of the original Masyumi Party. Among its members are Indonesian Islamist activists from the 212 Movement.

== History ==
On September 7, 2019, the Investigating Committee for Foundation of Islamic Ideological Parties/Preparatory Committee for Foundation of Islamic Ideological Parties (Indonesian: Badan Penyelidik Usaha-Usaha Persiapan Pendirian Partai Islam Ideologis/Panitia Persiapan Pendirian Partai Islam Ideologis, BPU-PPPII/P4II) was founded by various Indonesian Islamist reactionary groups. The group intended to form an Islamist party known as Masyumi Reborn, which they claimed was a revival of the Masyumi Party, which was banned in 1960 due to its involvement with the PRRI rebellion. However, before the party was officially formed, a number of the dissident BPU-PPII members unilaterally declared the Masyumi Party. The remaining members then founded the Indonesian People's Da'wah Party.

== Ideological and political stance ==
The Masyumi Reborn Party adheres to an Islamist agenda.

The party has been influenced by Islamism and anti-capitalism. The party openly forbade their cadres to express happiness, even only clapping and expressing gratitude or congratulations, claiming that those acts "resemble Jewish" practices and must avoid conventional banking or taking/getting financial interests from them, seeing them as a form of usury.

In an interview in December 2021, party chair Ahmad Yani stated that Islam recognises the concept of jihad in the sense of fighting on the path of Allah, but that it had two meanings: the first refers to upholding religious truth and values, while the second is means striving to uphold the principles of Islam laid down in the Quran. He claimed that terrorism has its origins in Europe, not the Islamic world. Ahmad Yani has also questioned whether the Omnibus Law on Job Creation is in line with the Indonesian national philosophy of Pancasila and has called for agrarian reform.

The party advocates implementation of sharia as the basis of law in Indonesia.

== Reception ==
The Islamist Prosperous Justice Party said that it hoped Masyumi Reborn would become a "friend" that would join it in monitoring the government to ensure it did not stray from the path of democracy or the principles of the independence proclamation

The centrist Islamist parties such as United Development Party said it did not see the new party as a threat or a rival, while the Crescent Star Party and the National Mandate Party, expressed similar sentiments. The secular Indonesian Democratic Party of Struggle welcomed the party as it welcomed any organisation committed to the national consensus of Pancasila [i.e. not Islam] as the national philosophy.

However, political scientists Syarif Hidayatullah and Adi Prayitno from UIN Syarif Hidayatullah warned that if the new party did not change its ideology, it could cause tensions, as the old Mayumi Party had been committed to the imposition of Shariah law and had been banned for its support of separatism. They called for the party to be clear about its ideology.

== Subsequent developments ==
The party had hoped to contest the 2024 Indonesian general election, and set a target f matching the vote of its predecessor in the 1955 elections, but failed to meet the requirements as it did not submit all the necessary documentation to the General Elections Commission in time. In the 2024 presidential election, the party supported the losing candidate pairing of Anies Baswedan and Muhaimin Iskandar.
