= Indonesia omnibus law protests =

2020 Indonesian protests against controversial law

Anti-Omnibus Law protests
- Part of Post-Suharto era in Indonesia
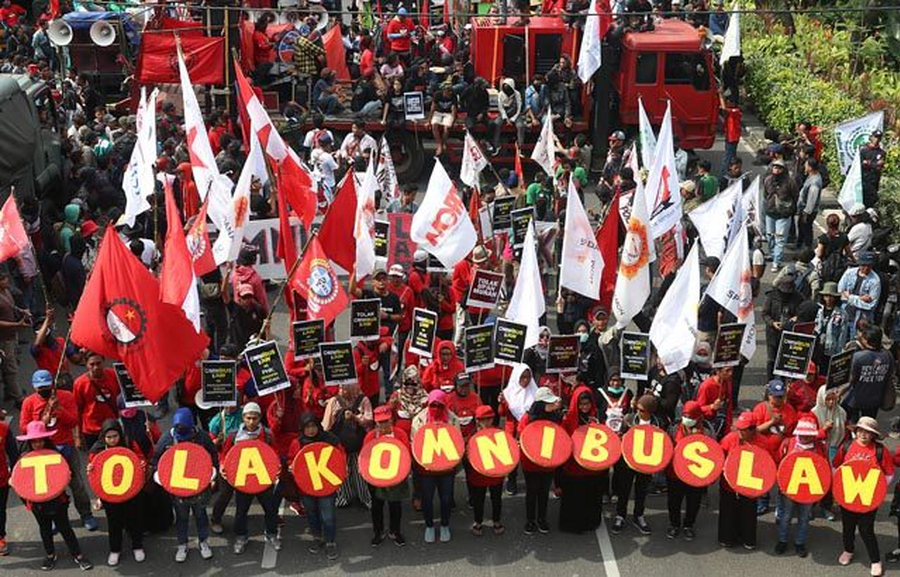
- Labour union forming the words "TOLAK OMNIBUS LAW" (Reject the omnibus law)
- Date: 13 January 2020 – 2024: First phase: 6 October – 4 November 2020; Second phase: 11 October 2021 – around 2024
- Location: Indonesia (most notably Jakarta)
- Caused by: Deliberation and passing of the Omnibus Law on Job Creation by the People's Representative Council; Ratification of 2021 minimum wage
- Goals: Demanding the revocation of the Omnibus Law; Resignation of Joko Widodo; Urging the passing of the Elimination of Sexual Violence Bill (RUU PKS); Increase of 2021 minimum wage
- Methods: Demonstrations civil disobedience blockade riots arson looting Internet activism
- Status: Final status unknown, but claimed as success by an workers union: Judicial review of Omnibus Law on Job Creation on 24 November 2020 (later 16 December), later by early July 2021 the Constitutional Court of Indonesia rejected the judicial review. In November 2021, the Constitutional Court of Indonesia accepted the judicial review and declared the Omnibus Law bill “conditionally unconstitutional”.; Formation of Labour Party.; Amendment to the law, Government Regulation in Lieu of Law No. 2/2022, signed on 30 December 2022.; Abrogation of the Law No. 11/2020, replaced with Government Regulation in Lieu of Law No. 2/2022.; Constitutional Court accepted partial of the lawsuit from the workers union on 31st October 2024 by replacing 21 chapters from the act
- Result: Formation of Labour Party

Parties
| (Indonesia) Protesters: (no centralised authority): Workers unions; Confederation of All Indonesian Workers' Union; Public unions; More less supporters to Liberal protesters, adat for civil rights, centrists, populists, centre-left, centre-right, left-wing populists, and right-wing populists; Indonesian Youth Movement; Labourers with the People Movement; People's Struggle Front; Agrarian Reform Consortium; Children of the Nation Alliance; Greenpeace Indonesia; Students; Indonesian Students' Executive Body Alliance; Several uncentralised Indonesian students movement; Opposition; Democratic Party; Prosperous Justice Party; Action 1310; Islamic Defenders Front; 212 Alumni Brotherhood; Habib Rizieq Shihab Center; National Movement to Protect Ulama's Fatwa; National Anti-Communist Alliance of the Unitary State of the Republic of Indonesia; Anarchists | Indonesian Government; Indonesian National Police; Onward Indonesia Cabinet; House of Representatives; Indonesian National Armed Forces; Indonesian Army; Supported by: Pro-government social media influencers; Pro-government businessman and investors |

Lead figures
| Protesters no centralised leadership Action 1310: (Indonesia) Muhammad Rizieq Shihab Grand Imam of Islamic Defenders Front; Opposition: (Indonesia) Benny Kabur Harman People's Representative Council Faction of Democratic Party Member | Government: Joko Widodo President of Indonesia; Ma'ruf Amin Vice President of Indonesia; (Indonesia) Puan Maharani People's Representative Council Speaker; (Indonesia) Bambang Soesatyo People's Consultative Assembly Speaker; (Indonesia) Airlangga Hartarto Coordinating Minister for Economics Affairs; (Indonesia) Luhut Binsar Panjaitan Coordinating Minister for Maritime and Investment Affairs; (Indonesia) Mahfud MD Coordinating Minister for Political, Legal, and Security Affairs; (Indonesia) Ida Fauziyah Minister of Manpower; (Indonesia) Prabowo Subianto Minister of Defense |

Casualties
- Injuries: at least 204
- Arrested: 5,918

Map of Indonesia showing locations where major protests occurred

The Indonesia omnibus law protests (previously known as omnibus bill protests and referred colloquially as the omnibus law protests or anti-omnibus law protests; Indonesian: unjuk rasa tolak omnibus law) were a series of demonstrations and civil disorder against Indonesia's Omnibus Law on Job Creation which was passed on 5 October 2020 as well as President Joko Widodo. Demonstrations had begun on 13 January 2020 while the then-bill, claimed by the government as vital to boosting the country's manufacturing industry and foreign investment, was still being drafted. Protesters were concerned with the law's impact on the protection of the environment and working conditions.

== Background ==
One of President Joko Widodo's goals is to increase investment and industrialization in Indonesia, with an annual per capita income of Rp. 320 million and a gross domestic product (GDP) of US$7 trillion by 2045. As such, a new regulation is needed to cut the "red tape" of the Indonesian investment climate. The new proposed draft titled RUU Cipta Kerja (Job Creation Bill) was fiercely opposed by environmentalists, labour unions, and many oppositions shortly after its publication. The first draft was proposed on 12 February 2020. It contained 15 chapters and 174 articles to be discussed by the People's Representative Council (DPR) during the 2020 National Legislation Program. The bill was passed on 5 October 2020.

== Protests ==
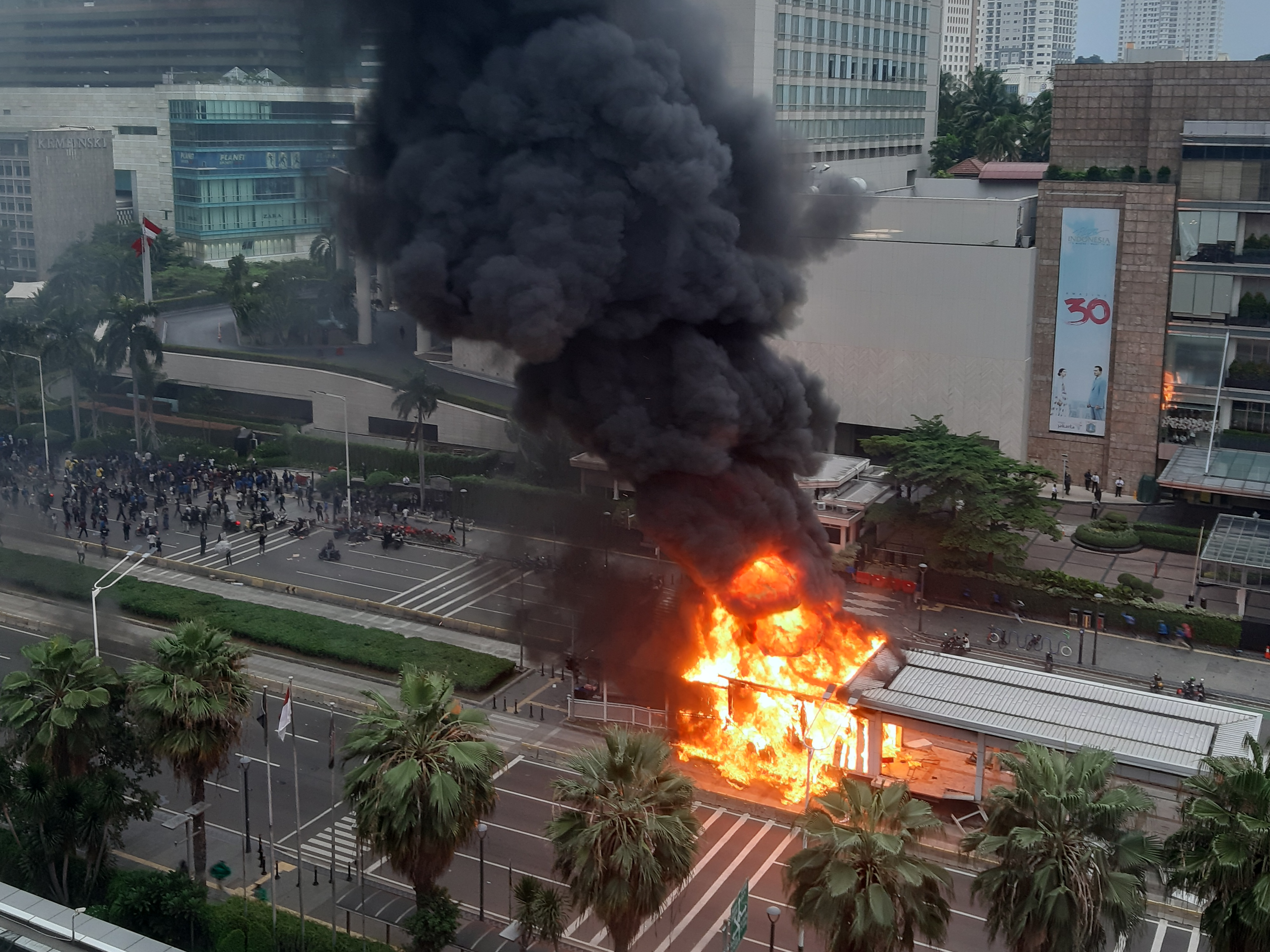
The Bundaran HI bus station burns during the protests on 8 October 2020. 11 other TransJakarta bus stations were also damaged.

The law sparked protests, originating in Java in January 2020. Protesters are concerned that the law could hurt both workers, specifically that it "would harm workers by reducing severance pay, cutting mandatory leave, allowing longer work hours, and permitting the hiring of contract and part-time workers in place of full-time employees"; and the environment, specifically that it "would lead to the deforestation of forests that are essential in controlling carbon emissions and slowing climate change" according to environmentalists. Several labour unions say that the law should include representatives from labour unions and not just investors. The government says that the law could help Indonesia's fallen economy during the COVID-19 pandemic. As of 8 October, at least 400 protesters have been detained, ranging from peaceful protesters to rioters.

Other than demanding for the law to be retracted, some protesters also demand Jokowi to resign out of office, calling current Indonesian politics a culprit. Other demonstrations also demands increase of 2021 minimal wage.

In August, a group of labourers across 20 provinces threatened to hold a more massive protest (Note: Original: Mogok nasional (literally "national strike action.")) from 6 to 8 October if the law is not retracted. The group's leader states that health protocols will be implemented to prevent the spread of COVID-19, and that via The Jakarta Post, "Whether or not we succeed should be an afterthought. What's important is that we fight." On 20 October, labourers plan on protesting again on 27 October at 1 pm with 5,000 students nationwide. However, there are no reported protests on the said date. As the last word, protests are planned to be conducted until 10 November, in which late October and early November will be a critical time, specifically with Widodo planned to sign and approve the law.

Antara reports that 145 of the 3,862 people detained as of 9 October have tested positive for COVID-19. The last major protest was on 1 May 2021 held by the Confederation of Indonesian Labour Unions (KSPI), Confederation of All-Indonesia Labour Unions (KSPSI), Farmer Union of Indonesia (SPI), and Indonesia Human Right Committee for Social Justice.

=== Java ===
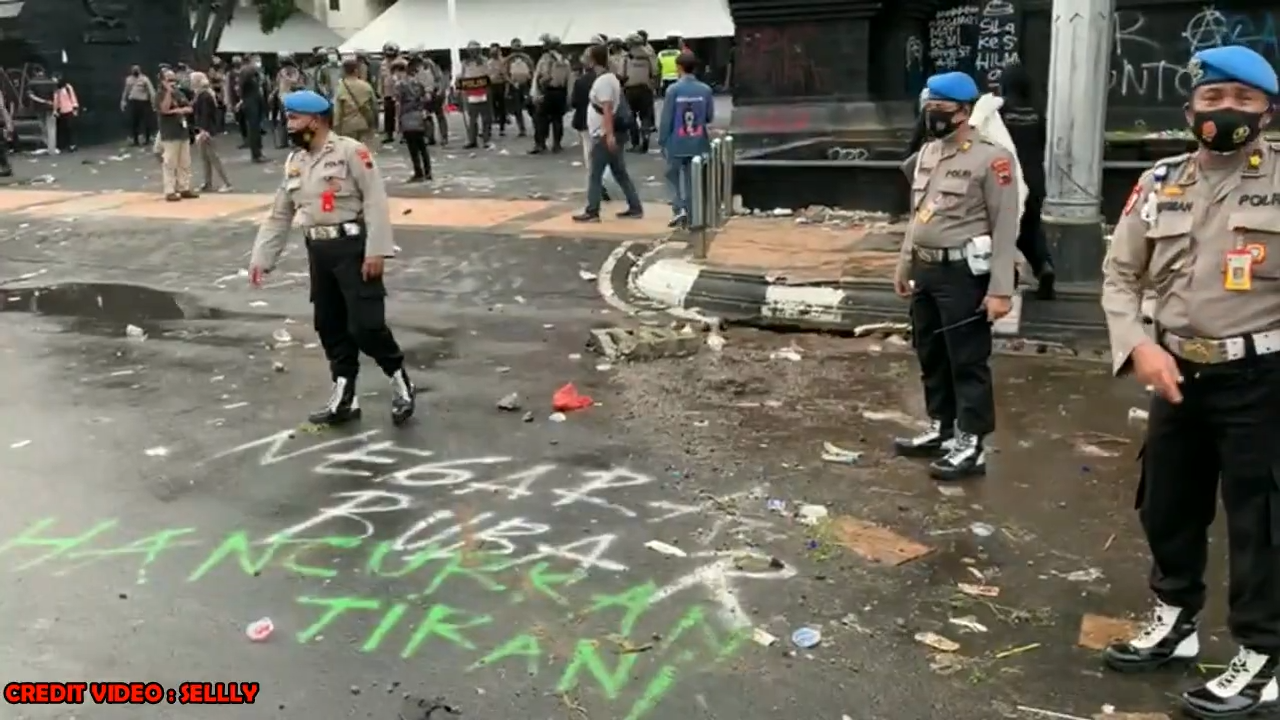
Aftermath of a protest at Semarang, Central Java.

Since January, many protests in Jakarta, Surabaya, Bandung, and Yogyakarta have been held in front of the Regional People's Representative Council (DPRD) buildings and elsewhere. On 6 October, labourers protested at the DPRD office. They complain that the law only benefits the politicians. On 7 October 2020, a clash between the police and protesters in Cikarang resulted in nine arrests. The police arrested two alleged anarchists on the way to join a demonstration in West Jakarta on 14 August; they had several Molotov cocktails on their hands and several books and stickers promoting or associated to anarchism.

The burning and overall destruction of properties were also seen in Jakarta, unprevented by the 2,500 police deployed by the National Police. Three police stations, Patung Kuda Arjuna Wiwaha, Tugu Tani, and Harmoni were burned and destroyed by rioters. The Grand Senen Theater was also burned, and the fire was fully extinguished at 22:00. Around 50% of the theatre is destroyed by the fire. School textbooks were also burned by students, along with six rukos and two vehicles. Police cars were also turned over. To make politicians aware of the National Farmer's Day, protesters set up scarecrows.

In Bandung, several people assaulted the guarding police. Bandung is also the first city to conduct a COVID-19 rapid test on the protesters. None had contracted the virus.

As a result of the massive mayhem, a toll road connecting Serang and Jakarta was closed for a day. The road leading to the DPR office was also closed, barricaded with barbed wires. This was thanks to the knowledge of authorities that a protest will be held. Several roads were also closed, which led to more fights with the police, although protesters there went home as time passed. In Jakarta, 398 tons of debris and trash were collected, overwhelming 1,100 workers and 12 road sweepers, and 50 garbage trucks. Bandung's streets were also closed. The 116 students who protested in Bekasi were arrested for one night at a police station. The next day they were fetched home by their mothers; all of them were instructed to kneel on their worried mom. Some cried while doing so.

Several police personnel were criticized for using excessive force on the protesters. It was reported that the police shot tear gas towards a group of protesters that were simply waiting for another group. Jakarta's police also said that they would not allow more protests due to the COVID-19 burden. A video recorded by the Associated Press (AP) showed a student collapsing three meters from a police barricade after a gunshot was heard. According to the South China Morning Post (SCMP), one student carried him away. His condition is still unclear.

A high-ranking police officer (Awi Setiyono) told CNN Indonesia that Jakarta does not welcome protests, and protests are only allowed outside. He says that they will be enforcing citywide patrols to ensure no protests will be held anymore in Jakarta. This policy was initially suggested by General Idham Azis via a telegram letter. Lawbreakers may be arrested.

In response to a plan on mass protests on 27 October, 6,000 police were deployed in Jakarta. Medan Merdeka Barat Street is also temporarily closed. Protesters were warned by Minister of Political, Legal, and Security Affairs Mahfud MD to be cautious of any intruders.

=== Sumatra ===
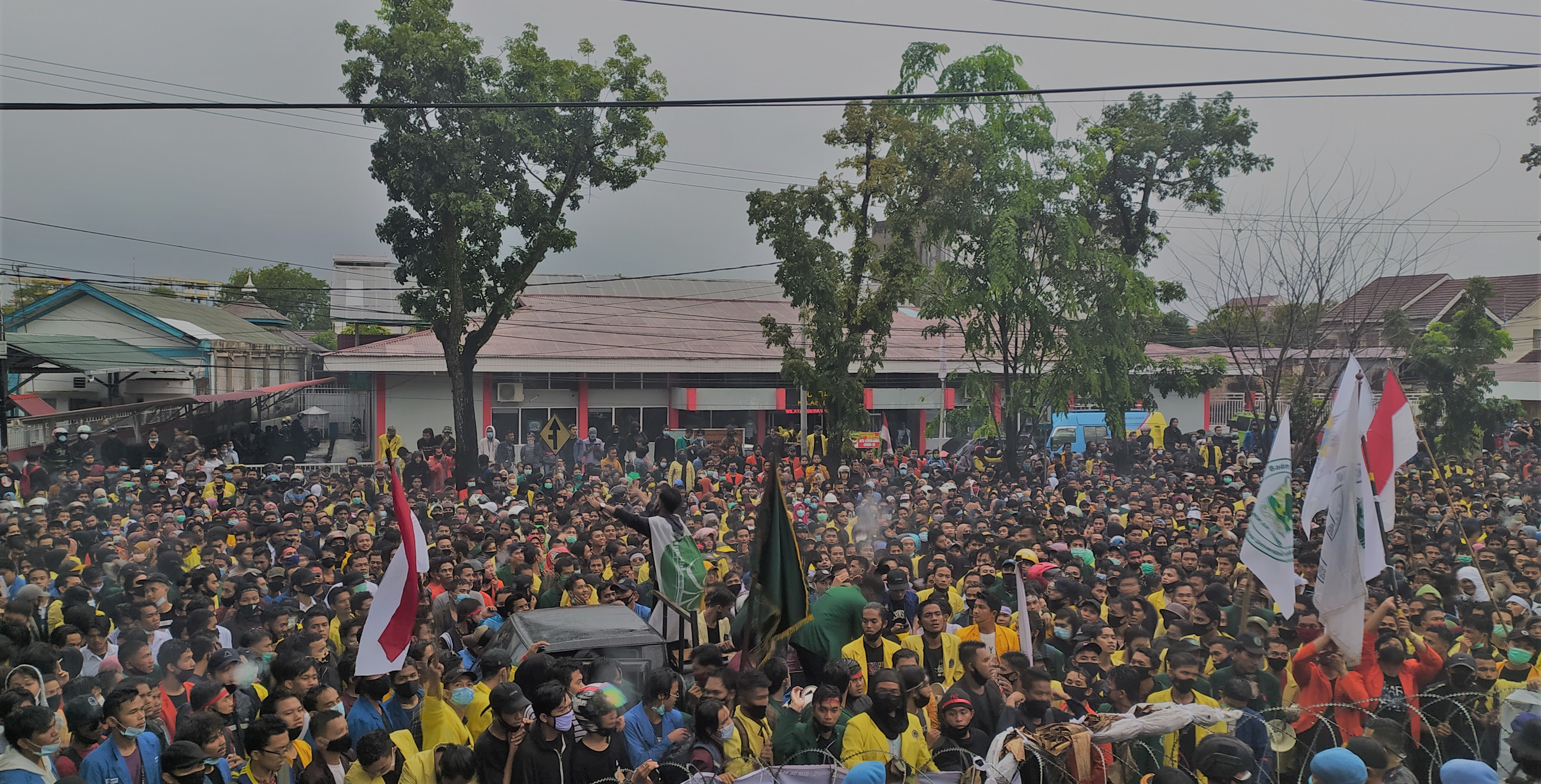
Protest at Padang on 7 October 2020.

A riot at Palladium Mall, Medan, 8 October 2020.

In Batam, a protest was held by workers and several labour unions. In Pekanbaru, protests occurred at the DPRD office. Police sprayed cannon water and tear gas. Roads were damaged too. Padang's DPRD office was also attacked. A protester forcing to get through the police barricades led to a series of rock fights. Protesters also burned tires. In the Bangka Belitung Islands, students held a peaceful protest in Pangkal Pinang. Meanwhile, in Jambi, protesters trespassed a fence and rushed to the city's DPRD office, destroying properties of it. Similar kinds of riots were also seen in Bandar Lampung. Victims were mostly police officers, with a protester rushed to Dadi Tjokrodipo Hospital due to neck injury, and 25 other protesters were treated in three different hospitals. News reports circulated that a student was shot; police called it "fake news" and urged people never to spread such news.

In Medan, riots occurred initially at the North Sumatran DPRD's office. Many threw various objects at the guarding police. Several roads also saw protests and riots. Some launched firecrackers, while others threw rocks and bamboo, which caused the DPRD office's glass to be damaged. To stop the riots, police threatened "Your parents are seeing these; people are recording this. Please stop, brothers, don't make trouble," as well as tear gasses and spraying waters using three vehicles. As protests calmed down, they continued, "Your future's a bright road ahead. Remember: This is Medan, our home." 7,000 personnel were deployed at the protest zone. Several stores were under attack as well; the stores immediately locked themselves down. Two police were injured by the rocks and bamboos. A total of 117 people were arrested. Many of the injured were rushed to Bhayangkara Hospital. Many of the protests ended in the evening.

Banda Aceh saw only peaceful protests and no riots. The protests were held during rainfall. The protesters, mostly college students, went to Aceh's DPRD office. Communication techniques include speeches, poems, and posters.

The only place where police expressed wills to abandon protests was Padang; this was due to Padang being a "red zone" of COVID-19.

=== Kalimantan ===
In Samarinda, East Kalimantan, Aliansi Kaltim Melawan (The Fighter Alliance of East Kalimantan) and Rakyat Kaltim Untuk Indonesia (East Kalimantanese for Indonesia) blocked a road section to the province's DPRD building and pushed themselves to get inside the building, raising tension and forcing the local government to deploy 30 members of the Indonesian National Armed Forces. In South Kalimantan, students and labourers successfully occupied the DPRD building. As a result, the speaker of South Kalimantan DPRD agreed to support demonstrators' cause on rejecting the bill. In Central Kalimantan and North Kalimantan, protests also turned violent. In Pontianak alone, 32 people were arrested while in Banjarmasin, a man who wants to disperse the protesters was caught having a sharp weapon on his hand in the middle of the crowd.

=== Sulawesi ===
On 16 July, a demonstration in Makassar turned into a riot, resulting in 37 being arrested by police, one of them a woman. In Gorontalo, police responded to riots with tear gas, wreaking more havoc. Several police officers also acted "provocative" according to the protest coordinator. Two protesters were hospitalized, six were arrested, and ten are lost. The police said that the protests were ended due to COVID-19 worries. In Palu and Kendari, riots also occurred. A video that shows police beating a student in front of a mosque went viral on Twitter, and three journalists are said to have experienced similar circumstances. Despite heavy rain, protesters in Manado did not stop protesting. As protests heated up, six college students were arrested due to throwing rocks at Manado's DPRD office.

The protesters agreed to move their protesting site 20 meters away later. Firefighting trucks were present to disturb potential rioters on site. Only 10 people were allowed to enter the DPRD office to voice themselves for tranquillity. Six people were arrested.

=== Nusa Tenggara and Bali ===
In Kupang on 22 July, a demonstration was held by students in front of the East Nusa Tenggara DPRD building. They waved the Indonesian flag and marched towards the building. Later, three students were arrested for throwing rocks against the police. A group of students sang the song "DPR Goblok," meaning "DPR Stupid." Some also designed a coffin and showed it off, as if the DPR members were inside the coffin. While in Bali, students and activists surrounded the DPRD building, pushing to get in while blocked by local police. Protesters were irritated by the tear gas sprayed by police. Police tried closing the road, but its huge usage by ambulances to Sanglah General Hospital forced them not to close them. Riots only occurred 1 hour after the regular protests. Demonstrations also occur on West Nusa Tenggara, resulting in the West Nusa Tenggara DPRD sending an aspiration letter to Jakarta for the law to be retracted.

=== Maluku ===
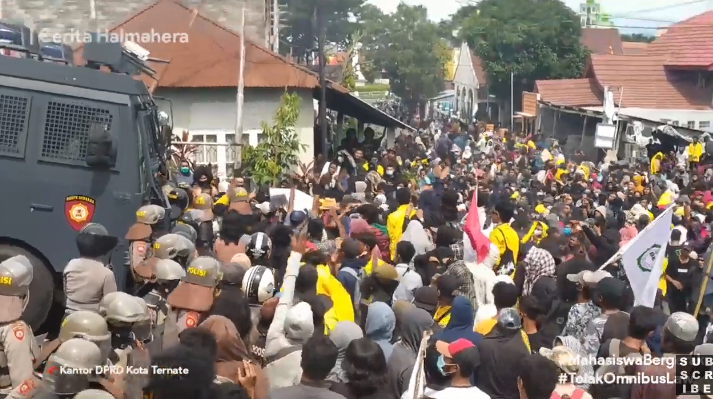
Riot in Ternate, North Maluku

Demonstrations were held in Ambon and Ternate against the omnibus law and demanding that the Elimination of Sexual Violence Bill be the nation's top priority. In Ambon, several college students broke into Maluku's DPRD office. Riots occurred for an hour. Several were arrested. The police said that they "thank" the students for "voicing their aspirations," saying that they will forward their messages to the government and the DPR in the form of a letter. In Ternate, North Maluku, riots occurred, and one journalist was injured. There were also destructions of property, with several rock fights between the protesters and the police. Tear gas did not stop the protesters from protesting, more so rioting. Several cops were "assaulted, kicked, and stabbed with traffic lights" according to a police officer. Two places in Ternate saw peaceful protests. Roads were closed. Several were arrested. In city of Tual, a protest also occurred and later successfully occupied the DPRD building of the city.

=== Papua ===
A Papuan news website wrote an article with the header written "#PapuanLivesMatter," asking for the bill not to be eligible in Papua, as it will hurt the farmers, exploit natural resources, and will have devastating impacts on the culture and well-being of struggling families. A protest occurred in Sorong, West Papua by students in front of its DPRD building, which later turned into a riot.

== Action 1310 ==
On 13 October 2020, the Islamic Defenders Front (FPI), the National Movement to Protect Ulama's Fatwa (GNPF) and the National Anti-Communist Alliance of the Unitary State of the Republic of Indonesia (ANAK NKRI) held a protest near the Istana Negara. Invitations to ulemas and other Islamic leaders to join the protest were shared via WhatsApp. FPI spokesman Novel Bamukmin said simultaneous protests would be held in other major cities across the nation. Organizers claimed there would be about 10,000 demonstrators, whereas police said they had been informed the number would be 1,000. Before the protests, Mobile Brigade Corps from other provinces such as North Sumatra and Maluku were deployed to Jakarta as part of a 12,000-strong security presence. #UmrahBersatuMenolakOmnibusLaw (English: #UmrahUnitedToRejectOmnibusLaw) became a trending hashtag on Twitter on 13 October.

Named Action 1310 after the date on which it was held, the protest resulted in the closure of roads, sidewalks, and public transport in the area. Streets leading to Monas, where the protest was centered, were to be closed from 10:00 pm on 12 October up to 1:00 am on 14 October. Governor Anies Baswedan's administration initiated traffic diversions to six roads. Rail passengers intending to ride to Gambir Station were advised to "plan a schedule."

The protesters began gathering at the Arjuna Wijaya chariot statue and fountain, next to an entrance to Monas in Gambir. The rally commenced at around 12:30 pm with a Qira'at. The protest was initially peaceful but turned violent at 3:40 pm when police clashed with youthful protesters. A police officer repeatedly used obscenities when threatening to arrest protesters, prompting some of the demonstrators to throw stones and plastic bottles at the law enforcers. Police responded with tear gas. Many of the teenagers retreated to the Sarinah Building junction and Hotel Indonesia traffic circle, while one teenager continued attacking the police. Nikkei Asia says there were around 100 of them. The FPI reportedly deployed an ambulance to help some of the many injured protesters, much to the vexation of the police, calling it the "Car of Dajjal" (Indonesian: Mobil Dajjal).

In Medan, a protest held by ANAK NKRI outside the Governor's office developed into a riot.

Balinese news agency Suara Dewata criticized the protests as "sinful," arguing that any protests under FPI's name are illegal, as FPI's organization permit has not been extended. It also linked the protests to the 212 Action, which challenged Jokowi's presidency. It further noted that FPI's lack of adherence to social distancing regulations would exacerbate the spread of COVID-19 cases.

Coinciding with the first day of the protests, FPI leader Rizieq Shihab was reportedly permitted to return to Indonesia after a long period in Saudi Arabia, where he claims he has been banned from returning to Indonesia. However, Ministry of Foreign Affairs spokesman Teuku Faizasyah said he has no updates regarding Shihab.

== Police brutality ==
A video showing police spraying tear gas to an ambulance on 13 October went viral, although the police insisted that the ambulance's maneuver triggers the tear gassing. Protesters and the Indonesian Legal Aid Foundation (YLBHI) accused the police of using excessive force, saying that they were not given access to injured protesters and that many protesters were lost, most likely detained by the police. The Commission for Missing Persons and Victims of Violence (KontraS) received around 1,500 complaints about police brutality, while the Jakarta Legal Aid Foundation (LBH Jakarta) received 288 reports. The Alliance on Independent Journalists (AJI) and the Legal Aid Institute of the Press (LBH Pers) reported that seven journalists were attacked by the police, allegedly due to fears of being recorded.

== Social media ==
Indonesian internet influencers and celebrities on Facebook, YouTube, Twitter, and Instagram rapidly promoted the law and urged the public to support the law deliberation. The hashtag #IndonesiaButuhKerja (English: #IndonesiaNeedsJobs) was used by several comic strip artists and content creators to promote the law and counter the opposition to the bill on the Internet, while many ads were reported to contain contents promoting or supporting the law. TikTok users made videos in support of the protesters, with various hashtags used. Many made comedy sketches or animations to voice their support of protesters and opposition to the law. In the same vein, K-Pop fans push hashtags on Twitter that oppose the law.

Social media users also coined the abbreviation Cilaka, which stands for "Cipta Lapangan Kerja," the Indonesian name of the law, also a mockup of celaka, Indonesian for "woe." CNN Indonesia calls these group of Internet activists the Government's Influencers Coalition (Indonesian: Koalisi Influencer Pemerintah). Social deduction game Among Us became trending, with supporters of the protests comparing DPR to the Impostor, an antagonist in the game that could kill the other people (Crewmates) and travel through vents in a spaceship. Many players also named themselves "DPR" if they became the Impostor. In a severe case, a woman on TikTok claimed to be the mistress of a DPR member, demanding that the law be revised, or else she will "tell" something to his original wife. DPR calls this "discrediting," and that further actions can be taken if the identity of the woman is found.

As internet activists overwhelmingly criticized many influencers for supporting the law, some influencers stopped supporting the law and apologized. Ardhito Pramono, an Indonesian singer and celebrity, apologized on Twitter and stated that he had been paid to promote the bill. People started to associate this with Jokowi's meeting with influencers in Presidential Palace, suspecting that the influencers had been recruited and paid by the government to silence opposition.

Social media also has impacts on the youth's perception of the protests and is also a free place for activists to share opinions. Unassociated people were also seen "protesting." This comprises teenagers and children. In Bandung, a child was seen protesting. Upon investigation, the police concluded that the child is following what they saw on social media feeds. Seven people were investigated for attacking the police via social media in Bandung. Amid Action 1310, eight people were arrested for allegedly "spreading hate speech and violating the Electronic Information and Transactions Law." Korean artist DPR Live has been the target of online misinformation due to his pseudonym. Omnibus opposers repeatedly hate-commented his Instagram posts, and also mass-flagged his account.

Four users on e-commerce company Shopee reportedly "sold" the DPR building at a meagre price, ranging from Rp. 5,000 to 99,000, in a satirical manner. Another user on Bukalapak sold it for Rp. 123 million, while another user on Tokopedia sold it, as well as the members of DPR, for Rp. 100,000. DPR secretary-general Indra Iskandar says that such incidents are expected in a pro-democracy protest, and advises the police to take appropriate actions towards the sellers, that "those kinds of jokes, I think, have no place anywhere. He says that the Ministry of Finance should also deal with this. All three platforms have taken down all similar pages.

The Indonesian police stated that it would launch "cyber patrols" and "counter-narratives" to "mobilize public opinion against the strikes," specifically to remove or fact-check hoaxes about the law, the protests, and anything related. The document regarding the intention was leaked on Twitter on 6 October and was verified. An example of the actions is the fact-checking of a hoax circulating through WhatsApp, claiming that the protests would be terminated on 9 October.

== Reactions ==
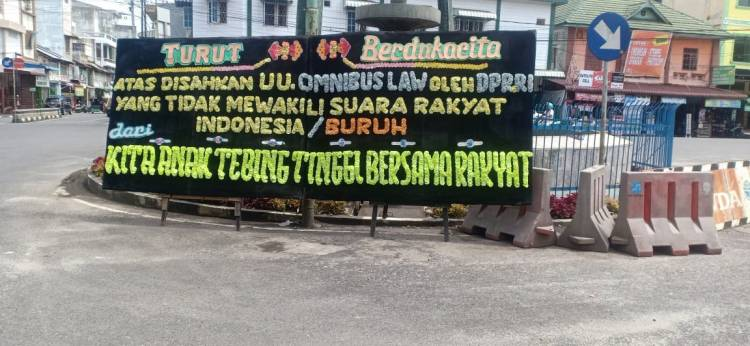
A satirical condolence board towards DPR in Tebing Tinggi, designed by the Tebing Tinggi Students Alliance, (Note: Indonesian: Aliansi Mahasiswa Tebing Tinggi (AMTT)) 13 October 2020.

Reactions by politicians varied, from voicing their support for or opposition to the law, or remaining silent. Many governors, regents, mayors, and DPRDs expressed their rejection of the law after protests erupted and supported the protesters. On 13 October, North Sumatran Governor Edy Rahmayadi says, "I don't even know what's the Omnibus Law. And I'm sure you too haven't known about it, so tabayyun (be wise). Don't spread misinformation, spreading them is sinful." As protests spiked in severity, President Joko Widodo flew to Central Kalimantan to see the progress of the Food Estate Project, a project focusing on Indonesia's natural resources. The general public criticized Jokowi for this, assuming that he is running away from the chaos. #Jokowikabur (English: #JokowiRunsAway) became popular on Twitter. Administration representatives denied that Jokowi was running away from the chaos, stating that the travel was "part of his scheduled agenda." However, the administration had voiced their support against the goals of the protesters. Jokowi responded in a live speech:

I see that many of the protests [...] were motivated by misinformation regarding the contents of the [...] law, and hoaxes on social media. I have to clarify again that this [...] law requires many [permits in order for it to be passed]. We, the government, welcomes suggestions and criticisms from the Indonesian people. If there's still any dissatisfaction towards this Law on Job Creation, you are welcomed to suggest a [...] judicial review via MK― the Constitutional Court. This is allowed by our country's basic systems.

On social media pro-Omnibus Law accounts, or cyber troops, were mobilized to support the bill and deter criticism. Besides flooding social media with pro-Omnibus Law hashtags, pro-government cyber troops mimicked and magnified negative stories of the protest published by Indonesian news outlets, accusing the protesters of being “anarchic” and lacking proper information on the law. Pro-government cyber troops also scorned the protesters as “hoax-spreaders” for posting tweets based on older drafts or for exposing government officials’ collusion and corruption. Some also instructed their followers, and coordinated with other cyber troops, to harass specific activists.

Videos and photos of police brutality have also been spread by international media. In response, Fadli Zon says that "[Indonesian] police brutality was being watched by the world. How in the world will investors enter a country with trash authorities like this?"

Tribun News worries that the protests will go on for a year or longer, similar to the Hong Kong protests. It also compared the protests to the May 1998 riots. An interviewed protester said that the protests would go on until the law was retracted. The SCMP and Suara Dewata both expressed concerns about the possible COVID-19 spikes.

On 12 October, a banner reading "KAMI terbukti menunggangi aksi demo buruh & pelajar" (English: KAMI was proven to be piggybacking the demonstration by labourers and students) was installed by an unknown party at Central Jakarta, which accuses the Action for Rescuing Indonesia Coalition (Note: Indonesian: Koalisi Aksi Menyelamatkan Indonesia (abbreviated as KAMI)) of influencing the demonstrations.

The Coordinating Minister for Political, Legal, and Security Affairs of Indonesia, Mahfud MD also predicts the demonstration will live until 28 October 2020. Spokesman of Labour with the People Movement (Gebrak), Nining Elitos says there was a diversion of issues on Omnibus Law on Job Creation demonstrations.

== Aftermath ==
=== Formation of Labour Party ===
During 4th Congress of the Labour Party, Said Iqbal, Chairman of Confederation of Indonesian Workers Unions (Indonesian: Konfederasi Serikat Pekerja Indonesia, KSPI) and sole candidate of the Labour Party's chairman at that time said that the passage of the law was defeat of Indonesian Labour Unions. He realized that, without enough powers of pro-laborers and pro-workers politicians or politicians from laborers and workers background, it is impossible to make stop of the law from being passed. Having they had enough pro-laborers and pro-workers politicians in DPR at that time, the law may be dropped and can be stopped from being passed. On 5 October 2021, Labour Party formed through amalgamation of the original 1998 Labour Party and many Indonesian Labour Unions.

=== Final Decision by Constitutional Court ===
On 25 November 2021, the Constitutional Court issued their decision. The decision ordered the government and People's Representative Council to "repair" the law from issues surrounding it in 2 years. The government and People's Representative Council shall not issue any derivative laws based on this law. If the government and People's Representative Council are failed to fix the law in 2 years, the law declared to void, and any amendments amended by the law will be undone.

=== Subsequent amendment and abrogation ===
On 30 December 2022, the amendment of the law, Government Regulation in Lieu of Law No.2/2022, was signed by Joko Widodo. The subsequent Government Regulation in Lieu of Law on 2 January 2023 stated that the law was abrogated and replaced wholly with the Government Regulation in Lieu of Law, in accordance with the Article 185 of Government Regulation in Lieu of Law No 2/2022. Despite the law being abrogated, the Labour Party and other mass organization rejected the replacement, instead wanting a law more favorable to them. Regional Representative Council member Abdul Rachman Thaha called for support from the people and the legislature to remove Joko Widodo from the presidency and impeach him for his administration's actions.

=== 2024 judicial review ===
On 31st October 2024, the Constitutional Court held the material judicial review from the workers union and accepted, which resulted in changes to 21 articles. The acceptation of the material judicial review reacted by the workers union positively.

== See also ==
- Politics of Indonesia
- Protests over responses to the COVID-19 pandemic
- Class conflict
  - May 2019 Jakarta protests and riots
  - 2019 Indonesian protests and riots
  - 2019 Papua protests
  - 2022 Indonesian student protests
  - 2022 Indonesian criminal code protest
