= 2022 Indonesian penal code protest =

In 2022, there were a series of penal code protests in Indonesia relating to a set of human rights laws in the old penal code that were repealed by the Indonesian Parliament. There were protests in Tasikmalaya and Bandung (West Java), as well as around the presidential palace in central Jakarta.

== Background ==
On 6 December 2022, the Indonesian Parliament voted to approve a new penal code for Indonesia on the basis of decolonization, which repeals the old penal code and its amendments. Initially, the new code was supposed to pass in 2019, yet amid mass street demonstrations across the country, the process was ultimately halted as President Joko Widodo had asked Parliament to revise problematic clauses. The protest comes as the new penal code introduced some controversial new laws, such as banning unmarried couple to cohabit; banning the defamation of the president, government ministers and agencies; banning of demonstration without notice; the witchcraft act (article 252); and the privacy act (article 412), etc. Some human rights experts have even called it "a step backward in Indonesian democracy".

The new penal code contains 624 articles, which the government claimed it had spent the past years gathering feedback from stakeholders, experts and the public following a nationwide protest against the code in 2019. The new code, which applies to Indonesians and foreigners alike, will not take immediate effect, but instead, three years after the bill is enacted into law, in which opponents can file requests for judicial review of the code to the Constitutional Court.

== Protests ==
On 15 December 2022, students in Tasikmalaya, West Java, temporarily occupied the Regional People's Representative Council office.

On 16 December 2022, students in Bandung, West Java protested in the Regional People's Representatives Council office (DPRD) Bandung, the Demonstrations clashed with the Indonesian Police who splashed water cannon to disperse the protesters. A total of 30 students were arrested.

In another demonstration during the same day, in the MPR/DPR/DPD building student demonstrators commemorated the 1,000 day death toll due to the #ReformasiDiKorupsi demonstration in 2019. "The government and DPR seem to have forgotten that five lives were lost as a result of the wave of rejection of the RKUHP in 2019," said Bayu Satria Utomo, the Chairman of the Student Executive Board of the University of Indonesia (BEM UI).

On 20 December 2022, the Student Executive body throughout Indonesia (BEM-SI) conducted protests near the Presidential Palace in front of the Horse Statue area, Central Jakarta. They brought a coffin and a delman with a photo of the President in front of it. The students said that the coffin symbolizes the "death of democracy".

== See also ==
- Indonesia omnibus law protests
