= 2023 Omnibus Law on Job Creation =

Indonesian legislation

Job Creation Act 2023 Undang-Undang Cipta Kerja 2023

People's Representative Council
- Long title: Undang-Undang Nomor 6 Tahun 2023 Tentang Penetapan Peraturan Pemerintah Pengganti Undang-Undang Nomor 2 Tahun 2022 Tentang Cipta Kerja Menjadi Undang-Undang (Act No. 6 of 2023 On the Enaction of Government Regulation in Lieu of Act No. 2 of 2022 On Job Creation into Act)
- Citation: Lembaran Negara Republik Indonesia 2023, 41; Tambahan Lembaran Negara Republik Indonesia 6856
- Passed by: House of Representatives
- Passed: 21 March 2023
- Commenced: 31 March 2023

Legislative history
- Introduced: 30 November 2022

Repeals
- Omnibus Law on Job Creation; Staatsblad No. 226 of 1926 juncto Staatsblad No. 450 of 1940 (On Nuisance Permit)

Amended by
- Law No. 3/2024 (On Second Amendment of Village Law, Law No. 6/2014); Law No. 63/2024 (On Third Amendment of Indonesian Immigration Law, Law No. 6/2011); Law No. 65/2024 (On Third Amendment of Indonesian Patent Law, Law No. 13/2016); Law No. 66/2024 (On Third Amendment of Indonesian Shipping Law, Law No. 17/2008)
- Status: In force

The 2023 Omnibus Law on Job Creation, officially the Act No. 6 of 2023 On the Enaction of Government Regulation in Lieu of Act No. 2 of 2022 On Job Creation into Act (Indonesian: Undang-Undang Nomor 6 Tahun 2023 Tentang Penetapan Peraturan Pemerintah Pengganti Undang-Undang Nomor 2 Tahun 2022 Tentang Cipta Kerja Menjadi Undang-Undang) is an Indonesian act which made the Government Regulation in Lieu of Act (Perpu) No. 2 of 2022 On Job Creation, a replacement of the Omnibus Law on Job Creation, permanent (the entirety of the Perpu is set as a schedule to the Act). The law was passed by the People's Representative Council on 21 March 2023. The law commenced on 31 March 2023.

== History ==
After the Omnibus Law on Job Creation declared "conditionally unconstitutional", Joko Widodo administration issued Government Regulation in Lieu of Law No. 2/2022 as temporary replacement of the law on 30 November 2022. by the Indonesian Constitution, any Government Regulation in Lieu of Law should be made into law if the law made into the permanent one.

== Controversial Articles ==
=== Flexibility on Outsourcing ===
Article 64 of the law granted flexibility to the companies to outsource their manpower, which labour unions disliked.

=== No Long Leave Rights ===
Article 79 and 84 of the law revoking mandatory rights for the workers to take leave outside leave regulated by the law such as annual leave, weekly leave, and resting. Long leave is not a mandatory, but companies are granted to create their own regulations for long leave outside the law regulated.

=== On Minimum Wages ===
Article 88C, 88D, and 88F granted central and provincial government to establish indexing to establish minimum wages applicable to provincial and regency/city level. Labour unions accused that these would ease formulation of formula to establish cheap wage.

== Reactions ==
=== Government side ===
Coordinating Minister for Economic Affairs, Airlangga Hartarto, expected the investment to come easily after the law's passage.

Japanese businessmen and industrialists welcomed the passage of the law positively, as Japan External Trade Organization reported.

=== Opposition ===
Prior to the passing of the law, Indonesian labor unions, motorized by the Labour Party, threatened to start nationwide strikes to bring total collapse to the Indonesian economy if the law passed and vowed to commit "jihad" against the government and law. Opposition parties the Democratic Party and the Prosperous Justice Party, rejected the law passage. Despite now being in coalition with the opposition, the Nasdem Party, however, supported the passage of the law.

Motorized by the Labour Party, as the law's passage becomes fruition, 5 million laborers across more than 100 100,000 companies will proceed to start a nationwide strike campaign from July to August 2023 to halt production of every goods produced. They will also hold sporadic weekly protests at the People's Representative Council and government institutions while filing judicial reviews to the Constitutional Court.

== Constitutional Status ==
The Constitutional Court declared the law constitutional and rejected cases filed by workers' associations motorized by the Labour Party on 2 October 2023.

However, the Manpower Cluster of the law was later deemed unfair by the Constitutional Court. On 31 October 2024, through Constitutional Court Decision No. 168/PUU-XXI/2023, the Constitutional Court decided to order the separation of the Manpower Cluster into a separate law, separated from the Omnibus Law. The Constitutional Court ordered the government to revise the law within 2 years.
