= Indonesian People's Da'wah Party =

Islamic political party in Indonesia

Indonesian People's Da'wah Party Partai Dakwah Rakyat Indonesia
- Abbreviation: PDRI
- Chairman: Farid Okbah
- Secretary-General: Yunasdi
- Founded: 31 May 2021; 5 years ago
- Dissolved: 16 March 2025; 15 months ago
- Merged into: Ummah Party
- Headquarters: Jakarta, Indonesia
- Ideology: Islamism; Anti-capitalism; Anti-communism; Anti-liberalism
- Political position: Right-wing
- Religion: Sunni Islam
- Slogan: Dari Masjid, Kita Bangkit! (From Mosques, We Rise!)

Website
- partaidakwah.id

The Indonesian People's Da'wah Party (Indonesian: Partai Dakwah Rakyat Indonesia) was an Indonesian Islamist political party, founded by Farid Okbah and other Indonesian Islamists on May 31, 2021. The party was later accused of being affiliated with Jemaah Islamiyah and became the centre of a crackdown on November 16, 2021. The accusation shocked many Indonesians due to the fact it was potentially the first time in Indonesian history that a potential designated terrorist organisation disguised operations as a political party and attempted to intervene and participate in the Indonesian political system.

The party effectively dissolved after officially merging with Ummah Party on 16 March 2025.

== History ==
On September 7, 2019, the Investigating Committee for Foundation of Islamic Ideological Parties/Preparatory Committee for Foundation of Islamic Ideological Parties (Indonesian: Badan Penyelidik Usaha-Usaha Persiapan Pendirian Partai Islam Ideologis/Panitia Persiapan Pendirian Partai Islam Ideologis, BPU-PPPII/P4II) was founded by various Indonesian Islamist groups. The group claimed to revive the Masyumi Party, a liberal democracy era Islamist party which was disbanded in 1960 due to their involvement with the PRRI rebellion under the name "Masyumi 1945." However, in the middle of the process, elements of the Action for Rescuing Indonesia Coalition entered the group and unilaterally hijacked the process. This led to both a breakdown of the preparatory group and the formation of the Masyumi Reborn Party. A number of faithful members of the preparatory group later founded the Indonesian People's Da'wah Party.

Despite the crackdown resulting in the arrest of the party's leader Farid Okbah on November 17, 2021, PDRI requested permission from the government to register as a party. The location intended to be the headquarters of PDRI, was reportedly fictional, and it is actually a house owned by Maisaroh's parents.

On 16 March 2025, during the 4th anniversary of Ummah Party, PDRI through its founder Farid Okbah officially announced merger with the former party. He previously considered this plan on 9 December 2024 during the Nationality and Ummah Discussion, which was attended by several Islamist political parties.

== Political Manifesto ==
The party issued a political manifesto on May 31, 2021. The manifesto preamble contained pieces of takfirism. It positioned the party as "Partai Allah" (lit. 'God's Party'), while condemning other parties as "Partai Setan" (lit. 'Demon's Party).

The dichotomy terminology of "Partai Allah – Partai Setan" was coined by Amien Rais, back on April 13, 2018, to demonize Indonesian political parties outside of "straight" and "righteous" Islamist parties. It has been used by Indonesian Islamists to politically attack outsiders and those who are not affiliated with their groups.

The misuse of this term for political reasons was being denounced by the Indonesian Ulema Council since April 16, 2018. It also cited the Jakarta Charter, and emphasized the missing "Seven Words", which was deleted due to compromise made in the past due to being conflicted and ambiguous.

The manifesto contained eight reasons/considerations/claims of the party, in which the party claims the reason for its existence:

1. Da'wah activities were far from promoting political Islam.
2. Floating stances taken by major Islamic mass organizations led to uncertainty in Indonesian Muslim's lives.
3. Long-lasting effect of "Islam Yes, Islamic Party No" teaching of Nurcholish Madjid, which the party sees as having neutralised much of conservative Islamist parties' political moves and influences, resulted in the growth of more secular parties.
4. Islamic political parties' insufficient efforts to aggressively accommodate Indonesian Muslims' aspirations.
5. Low and receding trends of electability of Islamic parties.
6. Lack of long-term presence of Islamic parties for Ummah.
7. Rise of capitalism threatening the economy and political process.
8. Need for moral movement for the sake of faith and self-resilience, and liberation from oligarchists.

The party, in the manifesto, offered:

1. Ending continuous political defeats of Islamist parties by channeling Indonesian Muslims' voices and attempting to take votes from the increasing blank ballot group as the source of party support.
2. By declaring inheritance of the spirit of Masyumi and Emergency Government of the Republic of Indonesia, the party intended to return the "glorious" Islamist-dominated government to Indonesia, repeating what the Masyumi Party had done in the past and bring Indonesia out from an "emergency crisis".
3. Fight against "oligarchist" oppression and "injustices".
4. Freedom for Islam and Muslims in the world, including the Palestinian, Rohingya, and Uyghur people.

From the manifesto, it is known that the party, aside from being committed to Islamism, is also practicing syncretic politics, mixing both right-wing cultural, religious, and ethical stances and left-wing economic stances.

== Crackdown ==
On November 16, 2021, the Indonesian National Police through its Detachment 88 captured Farid Okbah, national leader of the party, in Bekasi. With him, one party official and one high-ranked member of Indonesian Ulema Council were also captured. Initially, all of them were stated as being captured due to being senior, active, high-ranked member of Jemaah Islamiyah, which had gone underground for a long period of time and been accused of actively committing terrorism financing through a front organisation.

However, it was later alleged that the party organization was a direct extension and as a new modus operandi of Jemaah Islamiyah itself, in which, rather engaging in sporadic terrorist acts, the group attempted to intervene and participate in the Indonesian democratic political system. According to Detachment 88, the crackdown was based on the witness testimony of earlier-captured 28 terrorists. Before Farid was captured, the governor of Jakarta, Anies Baswedan met him on 14 November, when Farid's parents-in-law died a day earlier.

According to the head of the general information section of the Indonesian National Police's public relations division, Ahmad Ramadhan, the alleged terrorists Farid Okbah, Ahmad Zain An-Najah, and Anung Al-Hamad were threatened with imprisonment for up to 15 years. Farid and Anung also involved in the Jemaah Islamiyah-owned zakat institution, Baitul Maal Abdurrahman Bin Auf (BM ABA), of which its permission was officially removed on 29 January 2021.

As the result of their involvement, Farid, Ahmad Zain, and Anung were sentenced to 3 years in prison on 19 December 2022 for conspiring to promote terrorism and involvement in financial crimes advantaging the terrorist groups.
