= National Legislation Program =

Official framework for lawmaking in Indonesia

The National Legislation Program (Indonesian: Program Legislasi Nasional, commonly known as the Prolegnas) is the official framework for lawmaking in Indonesia. It contains a prioritized list of draft bills (Rancangan Undang-Undang, abbreviated as RUU) proposed for deliberation and enactment by the House of Representatives (DPR), the government, and the Regional Representatives Council (DPD). First conceived in the 1970s and formalized in the 1980s, it gave the National Law Development Agency (BPHN) a central role in legislative planning, later reinforced by presidential regulations that standardized drafting procedures.

The program operates on two levels: a five‑year medium‑term plan and an annual priority list, complemented by an open cumulative list for urgent matters. Preparation and review are carried out jointly by the DPR, DPD, and Government, with input from members, commissions, and the public, ensuring that the program adapts to legal developments and societal needs. The Prolegnas has been criticized for being inflexible, as bills outside its list are seldom considered. Concerns were also raised that the program often failed to meet targets because of ambitious goals, limited legislative capacity, and weak criteria for selecting bills.

== Overview ==
The Prolegnas is regulated by the 2011 Law Formulation Act and is supplemented—for implementation purposes—by Presidential Regulation No. 87 of 2014 and DPR Regulation No. 2 of 2020. Article 1(9) of the 2011 law defined it as "a planning instrument for the preparation of legislation, compiled in a planned, integrated, and systematic manner." The program serves as a priority list of bills, with the aim of realizing a coherent national legal system. The drafting of the Prolegnas is based on several considerations, including the mandate of the 1945 Constitution, resolutions of the People's Consultative Assembly (MPR), and other laws. It also refers to the national development planning system, the long-term and medium-term development plans, the Government's annual work plan, and the strategic plans of the House of Representatives (DPR) and the Regional Representative Council (DPD). In addition, it takes into account the list of bills from the previous parliamentary term that were not completed (carry-over motion), the results of monitoring and review of existing laws by the DPR, DPD, and the Government, as well as the aspirations and legal needs of the public.

The preparation of the Prolegnas is carried out jointly by the DPR and the Government, and later, by the DPD. Coordination among these three institutions is led by the DPR through its Legislative Body (Badan Legislasi, or the Baleg). Within the DPR, the Baleg is responsible for coordination; within the DPD, the task is handled by the Committee for Drafting Laws (Panitia Perancang Undang-Undang, or PPUU); and within the Government, it is coordinated by the minister responsible for legal affairs. Each bill listed in the Prolegnas must specify its title, subject matter, and relationship to existing laws. Its conceptual framework typically outlines the background and purpose of drafting, the objectives to be achieved, and the scope and direction of regulation.

=== Drafting bills ===
Articles 16 to 23 of the 2011 law regulate the process of drafting bills. Bills may be prepared by the Government, the DPR, or the DPD. An academic draft (naskah akademik) is generally prepared to provide scholarly justification, although laws remain valid without one. Government‑initiated bills are usually prepared by a minister tasked by the President. DPR-initiated bills may be prepared by the Baleg, which considers proposals from factions, commissions, individual members, the DPD, and the public. The detailed procedures for preparation are regulated by DPR and presidential regulations, respectively. DPD-initiated bills must address regional affairs such as relations between central and local governments, the formation or merger of regions, or the management of natural and economic resources, and require the support of at least one‑quarter of its members before submission. A DPR plenary session decides whether to consider the bill and may propose modifications; if accepted, it is forwarded to the president and, where relevant, to the DPD leadership, which nominates an official to take part in deliberations. Once drafted by a team of officials, academics, and experts, the Speaker of the DPR introduces the bill, accompanied by a Presidential Letter of Introduction (Surat Presiden) and the academic draft. A minister is appointed to represent the president during deliberations with the DPR, and the chamber is expected to begin discussions within 60 days of receiving the letter.

=== Drafting bills outside the program ===
The 2011 law also establishes procedures for preparing bills outside the Prolegnas, with further explanation provided in the 2014 presidential regulation. Such proposals may be introduced under extraordinary circumstances, including conflicts, natural disasters, or other urgent national conditions. In these cases, the proposal must be jointly approved by the Baleg and the Minister of Law and Human Rights. An initiator must first obtain an initiative permit from the President. The request must include an explanation of the bill's conception, outlining its urgency, objectives, intended outcomes, main ideas, scope, and regulatory direction. If the President grants the permit, the initiator prepares the bill and submits it to the Minister of Law and Human Rights together with supporting documents. These include the presidential permit, an academic paper and its letter of alignment, the bill text, and certificates confirming the completion of inter‑ministerial consultations and harmonization. Once the documentation is complete, the Minister of Law and Human Rights forwards the proposal to the DPR leadership through Baleg. The bill is then considered for inclusion in the annual priority list of the Prolegnas.

== History ==
The origins of the Prolegnas trace back to a 1976 symposium on legal and legislative planning in Banda Aceh, organized by the National Law Development Agency (Badan Pembinaan Hukum Nasional, or BPHN), Syiah Kuala University, and the Aceh regional government. The symposium concluded that a general framework for legal development planning was necessary and recommended the creation of a national legislative program specifying planning objectives, priority legal materials, mechanisms, tools, and supporting activities such as research, outreach, and documentation. As a follow‑up, a workshop was held in Manado from 3 to 5 February 1997 in cooperation with BPHN, Sam Ratulangi University, and the North Sulawesi regional government. Its objective was to develop a coordinated and systematic legislative program aligned with established procedures and drafting techniques. The workshop produced the first concept of the Prolegnas as a comprehensive plan for national legal development in the field of written law, to be implemented within each Five-Year Development Plans (Rencana Pembangunan Lima Tahun, or Repelita). It also affirmed BPHN's role in legislative drafting from the initial stages to completion, including research, legislative inventories, evaluation of existing laws, and preparation of academic drafts for bills and implementing regulations.

Institutionalization began with Minister of Justice Regulation No. M‑PR.02.08‑41 of 26 October 1983, which instructed all ministries and non‑ministerial agencies to establish permanent working committees for the Prolegnas. This formalized earlier legislative inventory work by BPHN and enabled it to coordinate the program during the third, fourth, and fifth Repelita. Prior to this, the Prolegnas operated solely on inter‑agency agreements without binding force. Presidential Regulation No. 32 of 1988 further strengthened BPHN's role in national legal development planning, leading to the inclusion of long and medium‑term legal development plans in the 1993 Broad Outlines of State Policy (Garis-Garis Besar Haluan Negara, or GBHN), the sixth Repelita, and the Prolegnas. At the time, the drafting process followed the mechanism established by Presidential Instruction No. 15 of 1970 on the formation of legislation, which remained in effect for over 25 years. In 1998, during the early reform era, this framework was replaced by Presidential Regulation No. 188 of 1998 on procedures for preparing draft bills, complemented by Presidential Regulation No. 44 of 1999 on legislative drafting techniques and formats. Further provisions were introduced in Presidential Regulation No. 68 of 2005, covering procedures for preparing draft bills, draft government regulations in lieu of laws, draft government regulations, and draft presidential regulations.

During the Megawati Sukarnoputri administration, following democratization, it was incorporated into the National Development Program (Propenas). The current system was first established under the now-repealed 2004 Law Formulation Act. On 23 March 2021, the House approved 33 bills as priority legislation for the year. On 19 November 2024, the House designated 41 bills as priority legislation for 2025.

== Programs ==
The Prolegnas is established for two timeframes: a medium‑term program covering five years, and an annual priority program. In addition to the planned programs, it also contains an open cumulative list for matters that must be legislated as they arise.

=== Medium-term program ===
The Medium-Term Prolegnas (Prolegnas Jangka Menengah) is drawn up at the beginning of each DPR membership period. The Baleg coordinates its preparation by requesting proposals from members, factions, and commissions, while also gathering public input through announcements, visits, and meetings. These proposals are inventoried and compiled into a draft list, which is then adopted as the DPR's official program and used as the basis for coordination with the DPD's PPUU and the minister. Deliberations are conducted jointly by the DPR, DPD, and Government through working meetings, committees, and drafting teams, where the number and titles of bills are agreed upon and finalized, ideally by consensus or, if necessary, by majority vote. The program is reviewed annually alongside the preparation of the annual priority list, with evaluations considering urgency, implementation, national legal development policies, monitoring of existing laws, and societal needs; these reviews may result in amendments, removals, or additions to the list.

=== Annual priority program ===
The Annual Priority Prolegnas (Prolegnas Prioritas Tahunan) is prepared each year before the adoption of the state budget, with the first‑year list compiled concurrently with the medium‑term program. Its preparation is led by the Baleg, which solicits proposals from members, factions, and commissions, supported by explanatory notes, academic papers, and draft bills, while also gathering public input through announcements, visits, and meetings. These proposals are inventoried and compiled into a draft list, finalized by the DPR, and used as the basis for coordination with the PPUU and the Minister. Discussion is carried out jointly by the Baleg, PPUU, and a minister through working meetings, committees, and drafting teams, where proposals are presented, the number of bills is agreed upon, and the list is refined before final decisions are taken, preferably by consensus or, if necessary, by majority vote. The program may be evaluated by the Baleg at any time to review implementation, legal developments, and societal needs, with results potentially leading to amendments, removals, or additions; such evaluations may also inform revisions to the medium‑term program when relevant.

The following is the current annual priority bills for 2025:

No.	Bills (Original title)	Proposer(s)	Date	Status
1	Broadcasting Bill; RUU Penyiaran	DPR (First Commission)		Ongoing
2	State Civil Apparatus Bill; RUU Aparatur Sipil Negara	DPR (Second Commission)		Ongoing
3	Criminal Procedure Bill; RUU Hukum Acara Pidana	DPR (Third Commission)		Ongoing
4	Food Bill; RUU Pangan	DPR (Fourth Commission)		Ongoing
5	Forestry Bill; RUU Kehutanan	DPR (Fourth Commission)		Ongoing
6	Traffic and Road Transportation Bill; RUU Lalu Lintas dan Angkutan Jalan	DPR (Fifth Commission)		Ongoing
7	Consumer Protection Bill; RUU Perlindungan Konsumen	DPR (Sixth Commission)		Ongoing
8	Prohibition of Monopolistic Practices and Unfair Business Competition Bill; RUU Larangan Praktik Monopoli dan Persaingan Usaha Tidak Sehat	DPR (Sixth Commission)		Ongoing
9	Tourism Bill; RUU Kepariwisataan	DPR (Seventh Commission)		Ongoing
10	Hajj and Umrah Management Bill; RUU Penyelenggaraan Ibadah Haji dan Umrah	DPR (Eighth Commission)		Passed
11	Hajj Financial Management Bill; RUU Pengelolaan Keuangan Haji	DPR (Eighth Commission)		Passed
12	Labor Bill; RUU Ketenagakerjaan	DPR (Ninth Commission)		Ongoing
13	National Education System Bill; RUU Sistem Pendidikan Nasional	DPR (Tenth Commission)		Ongoing
14	Tax Amnesty Bill; RUU Pengampunan Pajak	DPR (Eleventh Commission)		Ongoing
15	New and Renewable Energy Bill; RUU Energi Baru dan Terbarukan	DPR (Twelfth Commission)		Ongoing
16	Witness and Victim Protection Bill; RUU Perlindungan Saksi dan Korban	DPR (Thirteenth Commission)		Ongoing
17	Attorney General's Office Bill; RUU Kejaksaan Agung	DPR (Legislative Body)		Ongoing
18	National Resource Management for State Defense Bill; RUU Komponen Cadangan Pertahanan Negara	DPR (Legislative Body); Ministry of Defense		Ongoing
19	Strategic Commodities Bill; RUU Komoditas Strategis	DPR (Legislative Body)		Ongoing
20	Textiles Bill; RUU Pertekstilan	DPR (Legislative Body)		Ongoing
21	Protection of Indonesian Migrant Workers Bill; RUU Perlindungan Pekerja Migran Indonesia	DPR (Legislative Body)		Ongoing
22	Protection of Domestic Workers Bill; RUU Pelindungan Pekerja Rumah Tangga	DPR (Legislative Body)		Ongoing
23	Regulation of Modern Retail Markets Bill; RUU Pengaturan Pasar Ritel Modern	DPR (Legislative Body)		Ongoing
24	Agency for Pancasila Ideology Education Bill; RUU Badan Pendidikan Ideologi Pancasila	DPR (Legislative Body)		Ongoing
25	Regional Elections Bill; RUU Pemilihan Kepala Daerah	DPR (Legislative Body)		Ongoing
26	General Elections Bill; RUU Pemilihan Umum	DPR (Legislative Body)		Ongoing
27	Statistics Bill; RUU Statistik	DPR (Legislative Body)		Ongoing
28	Industry Bill; RUU Perindustrian	DPR (Legislative Body)		Ongoing
29	Climate Change Management Bill; RUU Pengelolaan Perubahan Iklim	DPR; DPD		Ongoing
30	Copyrights Bill; RUU Hak Cipta	Melly Goeslaw (F-Gerindra)		Ongoing
31	Indigenous People Bill; RUU Masyarakat Hukum Adat	DPR; DPD		Ongoing
32	Regional Government Bill; RUU Pemerintahan Daerah	F-PDI-P; F-PKB; DPD		Ongoing
33	Civil Procedure Bill; RUU Hukum Acara Perdata	Government		Ongoing
34	Narcotics and Psychotropics Bill; RUU Narkotika dan Psikotropika	Government		Ongoing
35	Industrial Design Bill; RUU Desain Industri	Government		Ongoing
36	International Civil Law Bill; RUU Hukum Perdata Internasional	Government		Ongoing
37	Airspace Management Bill; RUU Pengelolaan Ruang Udara	Government		Ongoing
38	Public Procurement of Goods and Services Bill; RUU Pengadaan Barang dan Jasa Publik	Government		Ongoing
39	Cybersecurity and Resilience Bill; RUU Keamanan dan Ketahanan Siber	Government		Ongoing
40	Nuclear Energy Bill; RUU Ketenaganukliran	Government		Ongoing
41	Archipelagic Regions; RUU Daerah Kepulauan	DPD		Ongoing

=== Open cumulative list ===
Both medium-term and annual priority programs include an open cumulative list (Daftar Kumulatif Terbuka), which permits certain bills to be submitted outside the list. This list covers bills on the ratification of international treaties, implementation of Constitutional Court decisions, the state budget (APBN), the creation (pemekaran, division, or merger of provinces and regencies/municipalities, and the enactment or revocation of government regulations in-lieu-of law (Peraturan Pemerintah Pengganti Undang‑Undang, or Perppu). Submission authority varies: treaty ratifications and the budget are submitted by the Government; Constitutional Court follow-ups and regional restructuring may be submitted by the DPR, the DPD, or the Government; and Perppu matters may be submitted by the DPR or the Government. Within the DPR, submissions can be initiated by members, commissions, joint commissions, or the Baleg, which also inventories Constitutional Court decisions requiring legislative follow-up for inclusion in the list.

== Reception ==
The program has been criticized as inflexible, since bills outside the list are rarely considered. The 2011 Law Formulation Act allows exceptions for treaty ratification, Constitutional Court rulings, the state budget, administrative restructuring, and emergency laws. From 2005 to 2008, more than half of the bills scheduled for deliberation were carried over to the next session. Political observer Koichi Kawamura attributed this low productivity to lengthy parliamentary deliberations. Similar concerns were raised in September 2014 by the DPR Speaker, Marzuki Alie, who argued that the program struggled to meet targets due to overly ambitious goals, limited legislative capacity, and weak criteria for selecting bills.

== See also ==
- Law of Indonesia
