= Action for Rescuing Indonesia Coalition =

Indonesian political pressure group

The Action for Rescuing Indonesia Coalition (Indonesian: Koalisi Aksi Menyelamatkan Indonesia, KAMI) is an Indonesian conservative political pressure group founded on 18 August 2020 in Taman Proklamasi, Jakarta. The group has claimed itself as a “moral movement”. It was founded by Ahmad Yani, Rocky Gerung, Din Syamsuddin, Gatot Nurmantyo, Rochmad Wahab, Meutia Farida Hatta, Malam Sambat Kaban, Said Didu, Refly Harun, Ichsanuddin Noorsy, Lieus Sungkharisma, Jumhur Hidayat, Abdullah Hehamahua, and Amien Rais. It is described as a right-wing, populist, traditionalist conservative, elitist, extra-parliamentary, non-partisan pressure group due to being founded by right-wing politicians and former generals who previously supported Prabowo Subianto during the 2019 presidential election (although most of the figures were politically independent from Indonesian political parties at that time). The group is also supported by members of the Islamic Defenders Front (Indonesian: Front Pembela Islam, FPI).

The group was born as a result of the nearly uninhibited power gained by Joko Widodo in his second term of presidency and weak opposition in People's Representative Council as a result of success of Joko Widodo in winning the election, defending his presidency, and successfully pulling large parties formerly opposed him.

KAMI does not intend to be a political party. Despite this, it has mounted opposition against Joko Widodo and criticized his policies since its formation. In addition, members of the coalition entered and unilaterally hijacked the Masyumi Party revival preparatory process that was already in the midway did by the Investigating Committee for Foundation of Islamic Ideological Parties/Preparatory Committee for Foundation of Islamic Ideological Parties (Indonesian: Badan Penyelidik Usaha-Usaha Persiapan Pendirian Partai Islam Ideologis/Panitia Persiapan Pendirian Partai Islam Ideologis, BPU-PPPII/P4II) group. This led to a breakdown of the preparatory group and the formation of the Masyumi Reborn Party. Several faithful members of the preparatory group later founded the Indonesian People's Da'wah Party. Either unknown to them and the Masyumi Reborn Party or not, the preparatory group actually are Jemaah Islamiyah members in disguise, and on 16 November 2021, the Indonesian People's Da'wah Party suffered crackdown and became the center of the scandal.

Since the group came from various political background and ideologies but with same goal to topple Joko Widodo from presidency, the group much likely an "Anti-Joko Widodo movement".

== Controversies ==
KAMI has been criticized for continuously spreading distrust and skepticism against the ruling government and its policies to combat the COVID-19 pandemic in Indonesia.

The group was accused of piggybacking the Indonesia omnibus law protests by an unknown pro-government group in an anti-KAMI banner they installed in Jakarta on 12 October 2020. On 13 October 2020, three KAMI central committee members were arrested by police under suspicion of spreading misinformation.

KAMI attempted to push the People's Consultative Assembly into holding a special session to fire Joko Widodo from the presidency. As a result, members of People's Consultative Assembly and political experts criticized KAMI.

KAMI supported the Islamic Defenders Front (FPI) and its Revolusi Akhlak (Indonesian: Moral Revolution) program in an attempt to topple the current ruling government, deemed "immoral" and worth toppling to "save Indonesia". This expression of support was announced by KAMI before the FPI was forcefully disbanded on 30 December 2020.

KAMI also alleged that communists had infiltrated the Indonesian National Armed Forces, and are attempting to rewrite a false version of history, erasing the legacies of Suharto and memorials to the victims of the 30 September Movement. Gatot Nurmantyo, a member of KAMI central committee, cites the demolition of the statues of Suharto and other generals on the Kostrad headquarters. In fact, the statues were removed by the sculptor due to personal religious reasons. As the result of the slanderous allegation launching, People's Representative Council requested that Gatot take responsibility for his statements and asked him to present his proofs of communist return in Indonesia. Academics and historians also urged Gatot to deliver his proofs to the Indonesian National Armed Forces, National Police, Ministry of Defense, and Coordinating Ministry for Political, Legal, and Security Affairs for clarification, given Gatot is a former Commander of the Indonesian National Armed Forces, which made him an honorable person.

== Opposition ==
A pro-government extra-parliamentary mass organization, Unanimous Homeland Unity for Indonesia our Homeland (Indonesian: Kebijakan Kerapatan Indonesia Tanah Air, KITA), was launched on 9 September 2020 in Bandung by Maman Imanulhaq, a modernist pluralist kyai from West Java, Nahdlatul Ulama activist, and politically affiliated with National Awakening Party. The movement is a counter-movement against KAMI negativism and pessimism.
