= Law Formulation Act =

Indonesian legislation

UU Pembentukan Peraturan Perundang-undangan (UU PPP)

People's Representative Council
- Long title: Undang-Undang Nomor 13 Tahun 2022 tentang Perubahan Kedua atas Undang-Undang Nomor 12 Tahun 2011 tentang Pembentukan Peraturan Perundang-Undangan (Law No. 13/2022 in regards of Second Amendment of Law No. 12/2011 on Law Formulation)
- Citation: Law No. 13/2022
- Territorial extent: Indonesia
- Passed by: People's Representative Council
- Passed: 24 May 2022
- Commenced: 16 June 2022

Legislative history
- Bill title: RUU Pembentukan Peraturan Perundang-undangan (Bill on Law Formulation)
- Introduced by: People's Representative Council
- Introduced: 2 February 2022

Amends
- 2 laws.
- Status: In force

The Law Formulation Act (Indonesian: Undang - undang Pembentukan Peraturan Perundang-undangan, UU PPP) or officially titled Law No. 13/2022 in regards of Second Amendment of Law No. 12/2011 on Law Formulation (Indonesian: Undang-undang Nomor 13 Tahun 2022 tentang Perubahan Kedua atas Undang-Undang Nomor 12 Tahun 2011 tentang Pembentukan Peraturan Perundang-Undangan) is an act of parliament that enables formulation of omnibus law in Indonesia.

== History ==
After Constitutional Court decided the Omnibus Law on Job Creation is "conditionally unconstitutional", the court ordered the government and the People's Representative Council (DPR) to "repair" the law from issues surrounding it over two years. The government and People's Representative Council shall not issue any derivative laws based on this law. If the law isn't rectified in two years, it will be declared void and any amendments made to it will be undone. Among issues regarding the law was because the law is made omnibus, in which not recognized by Indonesian law making system which regulated thru Law No. 12/2011 on Law Formulation (Indonesian: Undang - undang Pembentukan Peraturan Perundang-undangan) and its amendment Law No. 15/2019 in regards of Amendment of Law No. 12/2011 on Law Formulation (Indonesian: Undang-undang Nomor 15 Tahun 2019 tentang Perubahan atas Undang-Undang Nomor 12 Tahun 2011 tentang Pembentukan Peraturan Perundang-Undangan).

In order to safe the law and also other omnibus bills, in response of the Constitutional Court's decision, DPR swiftly made the bill for revision of the laws. The bill drafters were from DPR's Board of Experts, led by Dr. Inosentius Samsul as chief bill drafter. The bill addressed to 15 issues in Indonesian law making system which make omnibus law making in Indonesia is impossible.

The bill of law passed on 24 May 2022 by the DPR, commenced on 16 June 2022, and finally published on 20 June 2022.

== Major changes to Indonesian law making system ==
The law make changes to Indonesian law making system, such as:

- Promulgation of President-signed law products such as Indonesian Laws, Government Regulation, and Presidential Decrees are no longer vested to Ministry of Law and Human Rights after this law issued. The promulgation powers are transferred and vested to State Secretary.
- Mechanisms on formulation for omnibus law making.
- Provided limited technical fixing if the law product contain technical error(s) such as typos. Major errors like substantial or content error are not possible to fix any way, except must be undone and made new.
- Electronic signing for law products are legalized and validated by this law. Prior this, the law products were required to be signed with wet ink.
