= 2020 Omnibus Law on Job Creation =

Indonesian law

Job Creation Act Undang-Undang Cipta Kerja

People's Representative Council
- Long title: Undang-Undang Republik Indonesia Nomor 11 Tahun 2020 Tentang Cipta Kerja (Act No. 11/2020 on Job Creation)
- Citation: "UU Cipta Kerja", Law No. 11/2020 (in Indonesian).
- Passed by: People's Representative Council
- Passed: 5 October 2020
- Enacted: 2 November 2020

Amends
- 79 acts. incl. the Labour Act, Spatial Planning Act, and the Environmental Management Act.

Amended by
- Government Regulation in Lieu of Law No. 2/2022
- Status: Repealed

The Job Creation Act (Indonesian: Undang-Undang Cipta Kerja), officially Act Number 11/2020 on Job Creation (Undang-Undang Nomor 11 Tahun 2020 Tentang Cipta Kerja, or UU 11/2020), is a bill that was passed on 5 October 2020 by Indonesia's House of Representatives, with the aim of creating jobs and raising foreign and domestic investment by reducing regulatory requirements for business permits and land acquisition processes. Due to its length of 1,035 pages and its coverage of many non-employment sectors, it is also referred to in Indonesia as an omnibus bill. The final draft was changed to 812 pages due to pagination being changed to legal format. After being passed into law, there were various substantial text alterations and deletions, as well as procedural issues, which made its legal status eligible for being formally annulled.

The law has been criticized on the basis of concerns it will harm labour rights and indigenous land rights, and increase deforestation in Indonesia by reducing environmental protections. A series of protests are ongoing as of October 2020, demanding the law be revoked.

On 25 November 2021, the Constitutional Court issued its decision, calling the law "conditionally unconstitutional". It ordered the government and People's Representative Council to "repair" the law from issues surrounding it over two years. The government and People's Representative Council shall not issue any derivative laws based on this law. If the law isn't rectified in two years, it will be declared void and any amendments made to it will be undone.

In an effort to save the law, the People's Representative Council passed the Bill of Law Formulation on 24 May 2022, which enables the formulation of omnibus law regulation. Indonesian president Joko Widodo later signed the formulating law on 16 June 2022, effectively starting the process of revising the legislation.

On 30 December 2022, the amendment of the law, Government Regulation in Lieu of Law No.2/2022, was signed by Widodo.

On 21 March 2023, the amended law, presented as the 2023 Omnibus Law on Job Creation, was passed. On 31 March 2023, as the new law commenced, the 2020 Omnibus Law was repealed.

== Background and passing ==
On 20 October 2019, after being sworn in for his second term, President Joko Widodo declared his intention to revise laws that inhibit job creation. He later said the revisions would be made in omnibus laws.

The government initially aimed to submit the omnibus bill on job creation to the DPR in December 2019, but failed to meet its own deadline. On 12 February 2020, Coordinating Minister for Economic Affairs Airlangga Hartarto submitted the bill to DPR Speaker Puan Maharani. The government set a target of having deliberations conclude within one hundred days. However, the DPR leaders did not commence formal talks on the bill until 1 April 2020, when they discussed whether it should be deliberated on by a special committee or by the DPR's Legislative Council (Badan Legislasi)—a DPR body of eighty legislators from nine political parties. The Legislative Council was supposed to hold meetings to discuss concerns over the bill, but it instead formed a working committee for this purpose. The working committee, which did not contain representatives of all political factions in the DPR, began discussing the bill with the government on 14 April.

The draft version of the bill was criticized by elements of the Indonesian media, human rights groups, workers' unions, and environmentalists for favouring oligarchs and restricting people's civil rights. On the other hand, the Indonesian Chamber of Commerce and Industry supported the bill.

Following revisions of some contentious articles, the bill was passed by the DPR on 5 October 2020, three days ahead of a revised schedule and before another round of planned protests by labour unions. Just hours before the passage, thirty-five investment firms sent a letter warning the government of the bill's harmful consequences to the environment.

The passing of the bill was supported by seven parties: PDIP, Golkar, Gerindra, Nasdem, PKB, PAN, and PPP. It was rejected by two parties: the Demokrat and the PKS. It was signed into law by Widodo on 3 November 2020, becoming Law Number 11 of 2020.

== Bill ==
=== Sovereign wealth fund ===
The law mandates the creation of an "Investment Management Agency" that would be managed by the finance minister for the purpose of creating a sovereign wealth fund. The sovereign wealth fund will contain Rp 75 trillion (US$5.1 billion) in order to "attract investment" and "support the economy". This resulted in the establishment of the Indonesia Investment Authority.

=== Pay and work hours ===
The law abolishes minimum wage by sector, but allows regencies and cities to set minimum wages using a formula based on inflation or economic growth. The law abolishes fines for entrepreneurs who are late in paying wages. Previously, law No. 13 of 2003, the Manpower Law (also referred to as the Labor Law) permitted a maximum of seven hours of work per day, cumulatively making the maximum permissible hours of work per week limited to forty hours. The previous law also did not allow any kind of part-time work as a legal form of employment.

The law stipulates that the structure and scale of wages is to be determined by a company's capabilities and productivity. This abolishes the Manpower Law's previous determination of wages based on position, years of service, education, and competence.

The law reduces the cap on severance pay from 32 months' salary to 19 months' salary, plus six months' pay provided by the government. It also changes the 1-month of pay for every year of work standard for severance pay from the minimum pay to the limit. Overtime limits are increased to four hours per day and 18 hours per week, and mandatory holidays are reduced from two days a week to just one. The law also abolishes 2 months of long-service paid leave for workers employed for over 6 years.

=== Taxation ===
The corporate income tax will be gradually lowered from currently 25% to 22% (starting 2022) and finally 20% (starting 2025).

Digital companies such as Netflix, Steam, and Spotify will be required to charge customers a 10% value-added tax.

=== Foreign workers ===
Rules were relaxed for foreign workers, to ease hiring of foreign labor. Before the law was passed, outsourcing was only allowed for jobs that did not directly relate to production. Foreign nationals residing (for more than 183 days a year) in Indonesia will not be taxed for income earned abroad.

=== Environment ===
Environmental regulations for businesses were relaxed for projects not classified as "high risk", though such high-risk companies were still required to file an environmental impact analysis. In addition, environmental experts will no longer be involved in environmental impact analysis. The law hands over land use and authority permits to the central government and raises the fine for environmental damage.

=== Investments ===
The law shrinks the list of industries barred from receiving private investment from 300 to six: illegal drugs, gambling, endangered fish, chemical weapons, and industrial chemicals.

=== Firing ===
Rules for firing workers were relaxed and the required process of applying to an institution when firing workers, designed to protect workers' rights, were removed.

== Reactions ==
=== Protests ===
Since February 2020, many protests have been held around Indonesia in front of DPRD buildings and on various streets. Some protests have been peaceful, while others have turned violent, causing the destruction of property, as well as fatalities and arrests.

==== Role of social media influencers and fake accounts ====
Indonesian internet influencers on Facebook, YouTube, Twitter, and Instagram posted content supporting the bill during its deliberation. The hashtag #IndonesiaButuhKerja (English: #IndonesiaNeedsJobs) was used by several comic strip artists and content creators to promote the bill and counter opposition on the internet, while advertising campaigns supporting the bill were launched. One such influencer, singer Ardhito Pramono, later apologized on Twitter and stated he was paid to promote the bill. In addition to celebrities, other influencers and anonymous accounts were mobilized to populate social media with pro-Omnibus Law posts and deter criticism by using harsh words, harassment, and hoax accusations towards activists.

=== International ===
The bill was condemned by the International Trade Union Confederation and by 35 international investment institutions which collectively manage US$4.1 trillion in assets.

=== Domestic ===
Said Aqil Siradj, chairman of Indonesia's largest Islamic organization, Nahdlatul Ulama, stated his opposition to the bill and decried it for only benefitting capitalists, investors, and conglomerates.

Ridwan Kamil, Irwan Prayitno, and Sutarmidji, governors of West Java, West Sumatra, and West Kalimantan, respectively, along with the Prosperous Justice Party, have called for President Joko Widodo to issue a replacement law to override the bill.

Founder of opposition organization Action for Rescuing Indonesia Coalition (KAMI), Gatot Nurmantyo agrees with the law, saying, "I'll leave KAMI if it turns into a political party". Chairman of Gerindra Party, Prabowo Subianto also says the demonstration was funded by foreign actors.

==== Academics ====
A number of typos in the final version of the law raised the suspicion that it was passed in haste. Academic Bivitri Susanti expressed the view that the Job Creation Law had several procedural breaches that made it not legally acceptable. Feri Amsari criticized the illegal revisions of the final draft after the validation carried out by parliament that could bring a jail term for breaking Criminal Code section 264 relating to the crime of falsifying authentic documents.

== See also ==
- Indonesia omnibus law protests
