= Timeline of the COVID-19 pandemic in Indonesia (2021) =

This article documents the timeline of the COVID-19 pandemic in Indonesia in 2021.

== January ==
- 1 January
  - 7,395,959 specimens had been tested from 4,940,146 people. There were 68,418 suspected cases.
  - Indonesia confirmed 8,072 new cases, bringing the total number to 751,270. 6,839 patients recovered, bringing the total number to 617,936. 191 patients deceased, bringing the tally to 22,329. 510 municipalities and regencies had reported at least one positive case.
  - The daily positivity rate hit 29.46%, the highest ever.
  - Indonesia announced the closure of its borders until 14 January after a new variant of coronavirus was detected in December and had spread to some countries. Foreigners worldwide would be banned to enter the country's territories.
- 2 January
  - 7,429,489 specimens had been tested from 4,964,525 people. There were 69,619 suspected cases.
  - Indonesia confirmed 7,203 new cases, bringing the total number to 758,473. A record-breaking number of 7,582 patients recovered, bringing the total number to 625,518. 226 patients deceased, bringing the tally to 22,555. 510 municipalities and regencies had reported at least one positive case.
  - The daily positivity rate hit 29.55%, the highest ever.
- 3 January
  - 7,470,992 specimens had been tested from 4,992,303 people. There were 72,027 suspected cases.
  - Indonesia confirmed 6,877 new cases, bringing the total number to 765,350. 6,419 patients recovered, bringing the total number to 631,937. 179 patients deceased, bringing the tally to 22,734. 510 municipalities and regencies had reported at least one positive case.
- 4 January
  - 7,516,860 specimens had been tested from 5,022,974 people. There were 72,380 suspected cases.
  - Indonesia confirmed 6,753 new cases, bringing the total number to 772,103. 7,166 patients recovered, bringing the total number to 639,103. 177 patients deceased, bringing the tally to 22,911. 510 municipalities and regencies had reported at least one positive case.
  - Jakarta reported 2,507 recoveries, the highest ever by a province in 24 hours.
- 5 January
  - 7,577,380 specimens had been tested from 5,061,283 people. There were 70,201 suspected cases.
  - Indonesia confirmed 7,445 new cases, bringing the total number to 779,548. 6,643 patients recovered, bringing the total number to 645,746. 198 patients deceased, bringing the tally to 23,109. 510 municipalities and regencies had reported at least one positive case.
- 6 January
  - 7,645,288 specimens had been tested from 5,106,017 people. There were 70,029 suspected cases.
  - Indonesia confirmed a record-breaking number of 8,854 new cases, bringing the total number to 788,402. 6,767 patients recovered, bringing the total number to 652,513. 187 patients deceased, bringing the tally to 23,296. 510 municipalities and regencies had reported at least one positive case.
  - Jakarta reported 2,402 new cases in the last 24 hours, the highest by a province. It broke its own record from 25 December 2020.
  - The government announced the reimposement of large-scale social restrictions in the provinces of Java and Bali from 11 to 25 January.
- 7 January
  - 7,713,307 specimens had been tested from 5,150,808 people. There were 68,753 suspected cases.
  - For the second day in a row, Indonesia confirmed a record-breaking number of new cases; 9,321 this time, bringing the total number to 797,723. 6,924 patients recovered, bringing the total number to 659,437. 224 patients deceased, bringing the tally to 23,520. 510 municipalities and regencies had reported at least one positive case.
- 8 January
  - 7,779,926 specimens had been tested from 5,193,413 people. There were 69,121 suspected cases.
  - For the third day in a row, Indonesia confirmed a record-breaking number of new cases; 10,617 this time, bringing the total number to 808,340. 7,446 patients recovered, bringing the total number to 666,883. 233 patients deceased, bringing the tally to 23,753. 510 municipalities and regencies had reported at least one positive case.
  - Jakarta reported 2,959 new cases in the last 24 hours, the highest by a province. It broke its own record from 6 January 2021.
  - Indonesian Ulema Council declared CoronaVac as halal.
- 9 January
  - 7,836,984 specimens had been tested from 5,232,921 people. There were 69,865 suspected cases.
  - Indonesia confirmed 10,046 new cases, bringing the total number to 818,386. 6,628 patients recovered, bringing the total number to 673,511. 194 patients deceased, bringing the tally to 23,947. 510 municipalities and regencies had reported at least one positive case.
- 10 January
  - 7,883,009 specimens had been tested from 5,264,664 people. There were 70,381 suspected cases.
  - Indonesia confirmed 9,640 new cases, bringing the total number to 828,026. 7,513 patients recovered, bringing the total number to 681,024. 182 patients deceased, bringing the tally to 24,120. 510 municipalities and regencies had reported at least one positive case.
  - The daily positivity rate hit 30.37%, the highest ever.
  - Jakarta reported 2,903 recoveries, the highest ever by a province in 24 hours.
- 11 January
  - 7,921,070 specimens had been tested from 5,292,612 people. There were 68,572 suspected cases.
  - Indonesia confirmed 8,692 new cases, bringing the total number to 836,718. 7,715 patients recovered, bringing the total number to 688,739. 214 patients deceased, bringing the tally to 24,343. 510 municipalities and regencies had reported at least one positive case.
  - The daily positivity rate hit 31.1%, the highest ever.
  - The government extended the ban of foreigners entering the country for another 14 days.
  - The National Agency of Drug and Food Control (BPOM) published an emergency use authorization for the COVID-19 vaccine named CoronaVac from Sinovac Biotech for ages 18 to 59 with the second dose given 14 days after the first. At the same time, it also announced the vaccine's preliminary efficacy rate during its phase III trial of 65.3%.
- 12 January
  - 7,991,379 specimens had been tested from 5,333,160 people. There were 54,827 suspected cases.
  - Indonesia confirmed 10,047 new cases, bringing the total number to 846,765. 7,068 patients recovered, bringing the total number to 695,807. A record-breaking number of 302 patients deceased, bringing the tally to 24,645. 510 municipalities and regencies had reported at least one positive case.
  - Central Java broke their own record from 25 December 2020 for most COVID-19 deaths per province in 24 hours as they reported that 99 people had succumbed to the disease.
  - West Java became the second province to pass 100 thousand cases since the pandemic began; reporting 100,585 cases in total.
- 13 January
  - 8,063,068 specimens had been tested from 5,380,137 people; in the previous 24 hours, tests were conducted to a record-breaking 46,977 people. There were 59,667 suspected cases.
  - On this day, Indonesia broke the record for all four indicators except for the recovery numbers. It confirmed 11,278 new cases, 7,657 new recoveries, 306 new deaths, and 3,315 new active cases. Therefore, the total number of cases rose to 846,765, the total number of recoveries and active cases surged to 703,464 and 129,628 respectively, and the death tally jumped to 24,951. 510 municipalities and regencies had reported at least one positive case.
  - Jakarta reported 3,476 new cases and 2,952 recoveries in the last 24 hours, both were the highest by a province up to that point.
  - President Joko Widodo was vaccinated at the presidential palace, officially kicking off Indonesia's vaccination program.
- 14 January
  - 8,133,444 specimens had been tested from 5,426,234 people. There were 64,032 suspected cases.
  - For the second day in a row, Indonesia confirmed a record-breaking number of new cases; 11,557 this time, bringing the total number to 869,600. Another record of 7,741 patients recovered, bringing the total number to 711,205. 295 patients deceased, bringing the tally to 25,246. 510 municipalities and regencies had reported at least one positive case.
  - Indonesia added 3,521 new daily active cases, the highest ever.
- 15 January
  - 8,206,401 specimens had been tested from 5,475,700 people; in the previous 24 hours, a record-breaking 72,957 tests were conducted to 49,466 people – also a record-breaker. There were 66,573 suspected cases.
  - For the third day in a row, Indonesia confirmed a record-breaking number of new cases; 12,818 this time, bringing the total number to 882,418. 7,491 patients recovered, bringing the total number to 718,696. 238 patients deceased, bringing the tally to 25,484. 510 municipalities and regencies had reported at least one positive case.
  - Indonesia added 5,089 new daily active cases, the highest ever.
  - West Java became the second province to ever reported more than 3,000 cases in a day.
- 16 January
  - 8,269,701 specimens had been tested from 5,521,058 people. There were 69,414 suspected cases.
  - For the fourth day in a row, Indonesia confirmed a record-breaking number of new cases; 14,224 this time, bringing the total number to 896,642. A record-breaking number of 8,662 patients recovered, bringing the total number to 727,358. 283 patients deceased, bringing the tally to 25,767. 510 municipalities and regencies had reported at least one positive case.
  - Indonesia added 5,279 new daily active cases, the highest ever.
  - The daily positivity rate hit 31.36%, the highest ever.
  - Jakarta reported 3,536 new cases and West Java reported 3,460 in the last 24 hours, both were the highest by a province, surpassing Jakarta's record on 13 January 2021.
- 17 January
  - 8,315,839 specimens had been tested from 5,555,428 people. There were 73,243 suspected cases.
  - Indonesia confirmed 11,287 new cases, bringing the total number to 907,929. For the second day in a row, a record-breaking number of recoveries were reported; 9,102 this time, bringing the total number to 736,460. 220 patients deceased, bringing the tally to 25,987. 510 municipalities and regencies had reported at least one positive case.
  - The daily positivity rate hit the record for the second consecutive day with 32.94%.
  - Jakarta reported 3,775 recoveries in the last 24 hours, the highest by a province up to that point. This made it the first province to report 200 thousand recoveries in total.
- 18 January
  - 8,363,327 specimens had been tested from 5,587,809 people. There were 77,579 suspected cases.
  - Indonesia confirmed 9,086 new cases, bringing the total number to 917,015. For the third day in a row, a record-breaking number of recoveries were reported; 9,475 this time, bringing the total number to 745,935. 295 patients deceased, bringing the tally to 26,282. 510 municipalities and regencies had reported at least one positive case.
- 19 January
  - 8,433,961 specimens had been tested from 5,631,280 people. There were 76,971 suspected cases.
  - Indonesia confirmed 10,365 new cases, bringing the total number to 927,380. 8,013 patients recovered, bringing the total number to 753,948. A record-breaking number of 308 patients deceased, bringing the tally to 26,590. 510 municipalities and regencies had reported at least one positive case.
  - Central Java broke their own record from 12 January 2021 for most COVID-19 deaths per province in 24 hours as they reported that 104 people had succumbed to the disease.
- 20 January
  - 8,492,766 specimens had been tested from 5,675,028 people. There were 79,418 suspected cases.
  - Indonesia confirmed 12,568 new cases, bringing the total number to 939,948. A record-breaking number of 9,755 patients recovered, bringing the total number to 763,703. 267 patients deceased, bringing the tally to 26,857. 510 municipalities and regencies had reported at least one positive case.
  - Jakarta reported 3,786 new daily cases and 3,885 recoveries, both were the highest by a province in 24 hours.
- 21 January
  - 8,560,220 specimens had been tested from 5,718,753 people. There were 79,200 suspected cases.
  - Indonesia confirmed 11,703 new cases, bringing the total number to 951,651. 9,087 patients recovered, bringing the total number to 772,790. A record-breaking number of 346 patients deceased, bringing the tally to 27,203. 510 municipalities and regencies had reported at least one positive case.
  - The government extended the ban of foreigners entering the country for yet another 14 days, valid from 26 January to 8 February.
  - The large-scale social restrictions valid for Java and Bali were extended until 8 February.
- 22 January
  - 8,638,162 specimens had been tested from 5,770,517 people; in the previous 24 hours, a record-breaking 77,942 tests were conducted to 51,764 people – also a record-breaker. There were 79,349 suspected cases.
  - Indonesia confirmed 13,632 new cases, bringing the total number to 965,283. 8,357 patients recovered, bringing the total number to 781,147. 250 patients deceased, bringing the tally to 27,453. 510 municipalities and regencies had reported at least one positive case.
  - Jakarta broke its two-day-old record by reporting 3,792 new cases in 24 hours.
- 23 January
  - 8,706,505 specimens had been tested from 5,813,504 people. There were 83,190 suspected cases.
  - Indonesia confirmed 12,191 new cases, bringing the total number to 977,474. A record-breaking number of 9,912 patients recovered, bringing the total number to 791,059. 211 patients deceased, bringing the tally to 27,664. 510 municipalities and regencies had reported at least one positive case.
- 24 January
  - 8,754,507 specimens had been tested from 5,848,960 people. There were 80,114 suspected cases.
  - Indonesia confirmed 11,788 new cases, bringing the total number to 989,262. 7,751 patients recovered, bringing the total number to 798,810. 171 patients deceased, bringing the tally to 27,835. 510 municipalities and regencies had reported at least one positive case.
  - The daily positivity rate hit 33.25%, the highest ever.
- 25 January
  - 8,806,413 specimens had been tested from 5,883,540 people. There were 84,621 suspected cases.
  - Indonesia confirmed 9,994 new cases, bringing the total number to 999,256. A record-breaking number of 10,678 patients recovered, bringing the total number to 809,488. 297 patients deceased, bringing the tally to 28,132. 510 municipalities and regencies had reported at least one positive case.
  - Central Java broke their own record from 19 January 2021 for most COVID-19 deaths per province in 24 hours as they reported that 126 people had succumbed to the disease.
  - For the first time ever, Indonesia became the country reporting the highest daily new cases in Asia, surpassing India's 9,036 new cases on this day.
  - Indonesia's own-made COVID-19 detection tool called GeNose will be used for public transportation passengers, including trains and airplanes, starting from 5 February.
- 26 January
  - 8,881,607 specimens had been tested from 5,931,637 people. There were 82,156 suspected cases.
  - Indonesia confirmed 13,094 new cases, bringing the total number to 1,012,350; it became the 19th country in the world and the first in Southeast Asia to pass a million cases. For the second day running the number of patients recovered were record-breaking, as it reported 10,868 survivors, bringing the total number to 820,356. 336 patients deceased, bringing the tally to 28,468. 510 municipalities and regencies had reported at least one positive case.
  - West Java broke Jakarta's four-day-old record by reporting 3,924 new cases in 24 hours.
- 27 January
  - 8,959,395 specimens had been tested from 5,978,128 people. There were 81,589 suspected cases.
  - Indonesia confirmed 11,948 new cases, bringing the total number to 1,024,298. For the third day running the number of patients recovered were record-breaking, as it reported 10,974 survivors, bringing the total number to 831,330. Another record was set as 387 patients deceased, bringing the tally to 28,855. 510 municipalities and regencies had reported at least one positive case.
  - So far, at least 300,000 people in Indonesia received their first COVID-19 vaccine dose. Meanwhile, President Joko Widodo received his second dose.
- 28 January
  - 9,046,675 specimens had been tested from 6,032,242 people; in the previous 24 hours, a record-breaking 87,280 tests were conducted to 54,114 people – also a record-breaker. There were 82,676 suspected cases.
  - Indonesia confirmed 13,695 new cases, bringing the total number to 1,037,993. 10,792 patients recovered, bringing the total number to 842,122. For the second day running the number of patients deceased were record-breaking, as it reported a whopping 476 deaths, bringing the tally to 29,331. 510 municipalities and regencies had reported at least one positive case.
  - West Java broke its two-day-old record by reporting 4,532 new cases in 24 hours. It also broke Central Java's record on 25 January 2021 for most deaths in 24 hours as 200 people had died from the disease.
- 29 January
  - 9,124,005 specimens had been tested from 6,084,661 people. There were 81,497 suspected cases.
  - Indonesia confirmed 13,802 new cases, bringing the total number to 1,051,795. 10,138 patients recovered, bringing the total number to 852,260. 187 patients deceased, bringing the tally to 29,518. 510 municipalities and regencies had reported at least one positive case.
- 30 January
  - 9,194,031 specimens had been tested from 6,125,290 people. There were 74,985 suspected cases.
  - Indonesia confirmed a record-breaking number of new cases; 14,518 this time, bringing the total number to 1,066,313. 10,242 patients recovered, bringing the total number to 862,502. 210 patients deceased, bringing the tally to 29,728. 510 municipalities and regencies had reported at least one positive case.
  - West Java broke its two-day-old record by reporting 4,601 new cases in 24 hours.
  - The daily positivity rate hit 35.73%, the highest ever.
  - Indonesia now has the most active cases in Asia, surpassing India.
- 31 January
  - 9,238,689 specimens had been tested from 6,158,452 people. There were 73,652 suspected cases.
  - Indonesia confirmed 12,001 new cases, bringing the total number to 1,078,314. 10,719 patients recovered, bringing the total number to 873,221. 270 patients deceased, bringing the tally to 29,998. 510 municipalities and regencies had reported at least one positive case.
  - The daily positivity rate hit 36.19%, the highest ever.

== February ==
- 1 February
  - 9,286,902 specimens had been tested from 6,190,345 people. There were 76,343 suspected cases.
  - Indonesia confirmed 10,994 new cases, bringing the total number to 1,089,308. 10,461 patients recovered, bringing the total number to 883,682. 279 patients deceased, bringing the tally to 30,277. 510 municipalities and regencies had reported at least one positive case.
  - 539,532 people had taken the first dose of vaccine while 35,406 had completed the process with the second dose.
- 2 February
  - 9,358,604 specimens had been tested from 6,233,289 people. There were 75,533 suspected cases.
  - Indonesia confirmed 10,379 new cases, bringing the total number to 1,099,687. A record-breaking 12,848 patients recovered, bringing the total number to 896,530. 304 patients deceased, bringing the tally to 30,581. 510 municipalities and regencies had reported at least one positive case.
  - 596,260 people had taken the first dose of vaccine while 51,999 had completed the process with the second dose.
  - Jakarta reported 4,577 recoveries, the highest by a province in 24 hours.
- 3 February
  - 9,433,569 specimens had been tested from 6,280,182 people. There were 76,657 suspected cases.
  - Indonesia confirmed 11,984 new cases, bringing the total number to 1,111,671. 9,135 patients recovered, bringing the total number to 905,665. 189 patients deceased, bringing the tally to 30,770. 510 municipalities and regencies had reported at least one positive case.
  - 646,026 people had taken the first dose of vaccine while 71,621 had completed the process with the second dose.
  - Saudi Arabia banned people from and to 20 countries, including Indonesia, causing pilgrims unable to practice the Umrah.
- 4 February
  - 9,502,313 specimens had been tested from 6,322,350 people. There were 74,260 suspected cases.
  - Indonesia confirmed 11,434 new cases, bringing the total number to 1,123,105. 11,641 patients recovered, bringing the total number to 917,306. 231 patients deceased, bringing the tally to 31,001. 510 municipalities and regencies had reported at least one positive case.
  - 700,266 people had taken the first dose of vaccine while 96,553 had completed the process with the second dose.
- 5 February
  - 9,578,686 specimens had been tested from 6,366,581 people. There were 77,704 suspected cases.
  - Indonesia confirmed 11,749 new cases, bringing the total number to 1,134,854. 9,674 patients recovered, bringing the total number to 926,980. 201 patients deceased, bringing the tally to 31,202. 510 municipalities and regencies had reported at least one positive case.
  - 744,884 people had taken the first dose of vaccine while 120,725 had completed the process with the second dose.
- 6 February
  - 9,643,853 specimens had been tested from 6,414,683 people. There were 74,401 suspected cases.
  - Indonesia confirmed 12,156 new cases, bringing the total number to 1,147,010. 12,204 patients recovered, bringing the total number to 939,184. 191 patients deceased, bringing the tally to 31,393. 510 municipalities and regencies had reported at least one positive case.
  - 777,096 people had taken the first dose of vaccine while 137,207 had completed the process with the second dose.
- 7 February
  - 9,685,379 specimens had been tested from 6,445,583 people. There were 76,029 suspected cases.
  - Indonesia confirmed 10,827 new cases, bringing the total number to 1,157,837. 10,806 patients recovered, bringing the total number to 949,990. 163 patients deceased, bringing the tally to 31,556. 510 municipalities and regencies had reported at least one positive case.
  - 784,318 people had taken the first dose of vaccine while 139,131 had completed the process with the second dose.
  - Number of active cases decreased for the second consecutive day, the first time since 27–28 December 2020.
  - The National Agency of Drug and Food Control (BPOM) approved the vaccination of CoronaVac from Sinovac Biotech for elderly people, with the second dose to be administered 28 days after the first dose instead of 14 for regular inoculation.
- 8 February
  - 9,724,040 specimens had been tested from 6,473,598 people. There were 77,601 suspected cases.
  - Indonesia confirmed 8,242 new cases, bringing the total number to 1,166,079. A record-breaking number of 13,038 patients recovered, bringing the total number to 963,028. 207 patients deceased, bringing the tally to 31,763. 510 municipalities and regencies had reported at least one positive case.
  - 814,585 people had taken the first dose of vaccine while 171,270 had completed the process with the second dose.
  - Indonesia continued to ban foreigners and close its borders for more two weeks until 22 February.
- 9 February
  - 9,791,928 specimens had been tested from 6,512,126 people. There were 77,086 suspected cases.
  - Indonesia confirmed 8,700 new cases, bringing the total number to 1,174,779. 10,424 patients recovered, bringing the total number to 973,452. 213 patients deceased, bringing the tally to 31,976. 510 municipalities and regencies had reported at least one positive case.
  - 845,407 people had taken the first dose of vaccine while 221,453 had completed the process with the second dose.
  - Health Minister Budi Gunadi Sadikin mulled to add positive results from antigen swab tests to the official COVID-19 cases tally in order to expedite tracing of cases.
  - The national government extended the large-scale social restrictions in Java and Bali until 22 February, while introducing neighborhood-based measures and restrictions to isolate positive cases and enforce health protocols.
- 10 February
  - 9,862,240 specimens had been tested from 6,553,179 people. There were 77,526 suspected cases.
  - Indonesia confirmed 8,776 new cases, bringing the total number to 1,183,555. 9,520 patients recovered, bringing the total number to 982,972. 191 patients deceased, bringing the tally to 32,167. 510 municipalities and regencies had reported at least one positive case.
  - 969,546 people had taken the first dose of vaccine while 279,251 had completed the process with the second dose.
- 11 February
  - 9,933,751 specimens had been tested from 6,591,580 people. There were 76,911 suspected cases.
  - Indonesia confirmed 8,435 new cases, bringing the total number to 1,191,990. 10,145 patients recovered, bringing the total number to 993,117. 214 patients deceased, bringing the tally to 32,381. 510 municipalities and regencies had reported at least one positive case.
  - 1,017,186 people had taken the first dose of vaccine while 345,605 had completed the process with the second dose.
- 12 February
  - 9,987,708 specimens had been tested from 6,626,984 people. There were 76,505 suspected cases.
  - Indonesia confirmed 9,869 new cases, bringing the total number to 1,201,859. 11,000 patients recovered, bringing the total number to 1,004,117. 275 patients deceased, bringing the tally to 32,656. 510 municipalities and regencies had reported at least one positive case.
  - 1,017,186 people had taken the first dose of vaccine while 345,605 had completed the process with the second dose. No report of new vaccination in the previous 24 hours.
  - Number of active cases decreased for the seventh consecutive day, the joint-longest record with the decrease between 29 October and 4 November 2020.
  - Jakarta reported 5,636 recoveries in the last 24 hours, the highest by a province.
- 13 February
  - 10,025,524 specimens had been tested from 6,651,873 people. There were 79,653 suspected cases.
  - Indonesia confirmed 8,844 new cases, bringing the total number to 1,210,703. 11,919 patients recovered, bringing the total number to 1,016,036. 280 patients deceased, bringing the tally to 32,936. 510 municipalities and regencies had reported at least one positive case.
  - 1,060,326 people had taken the first dose of vaccine while 415,486 had completed the process with the second dose.
  - Number of active cases decreased for the eighth consecutive day, the then-longest ever record.
- 14 February
  - 10,061,418 specimens had been tested from 6,676,123 people. There were 86,456 suspected cases.
  - Indonesia confirmed 6,765 new cases, bringing the total number to 1,217,468. 9,237 patients recovered, bringing the total number to 1,025,273. 247 patients deceased, bringing the tally to 33,183. 510 municipalities and regencies had reported at least one positive case.
  - 1,068,747 people had taken the first dose of vaccine while 425,578 had completed the process with the second dose.
  - Number of active cases decreased for the ninth consecutive day, the then-longest ever record.
- 15 February
  - 10,087,796 specimens had been tested from 6,695,764 people. There were 88,669 suspected cases.
  - Indonesia confirmed 6,462 new cases, bringing the total number to 1,223,930. 6,792 patients recovered, bringing the total number to 1,032,065. 184 patients deceased, bringing the tally to 33,367. 510 municipalities and regencies had reported at least one positive case.
  - 1,096,095 people had taken the first dose of vaccine while 482,625 had completed the process with the second dose.
  - Number of active cases decreased for the tenth consecutive day, the longest ever record.
- 16 February
  - 10,115,963 specimens had been tested from 6,721,920 people. There were 86,960 suspected cases.
  - Indonesia confirmed 10,029 new cases, bringing the total number to 1,233,959. 7,609 patients recovered, bringing the total number to 1,039,674. 229 patients deceased, bringing the tally to 33,596. 510 municipalities and regencies had reported at least one positive case.
  - 1,120,963 people had taken the first dose of vaccine while 537,147 had completed the process with the second dose.
  - The daily positivity rate hit 38.34%, the highest ever.
- 17 February
  - Due to the maintenance at the Ministry of Health's reporting system, there was no explicit report about testing published on this day. There were 83,916 suspected cases.
  - Indonesia confirmed 9,687 new cases, bringing the total number to 1,243,646. 8,002 patients recovered, bringing the total number to 1,047,676. 192 patients deceased, bringing the tally to 33,788. 510 municipalities and regencies had reported at least one positive case.
  - 1,149,939 people had taken the first dose of vaccine while 597,328 had completed the process with the second dose.
  - The second stage of the vaccination program, covering at least 16.9 million public service workers and 21.5 million elderlies, officially began with inoculations of vendors at Jakarta's Tanah Abang market.
- 18 February
  - 10,188,747 specimens had been tested from 6,767,226 people. There were 82,444 suspected cases.
  - Indonesia confirmed 9,039 new cases, bringing the total number to 1,252,685. 10,546 patients recovered, bringing the total number to 1,058,222. 181 patients deceased, bringing the tally to 33,969. 510 municipalities and regencies had reported at least one positive case.
  - 1,164,144 people had taken the first dose of vaccine while 623,832 had completed the process with the second dose.
- 19 February
  - 10,277,568 specimens had been tested from 6,839,040 people; in the previous 24 hours, a record-breaking 88,821 tests were conducted to 71,814 people – also a record-breaker. There were 80,504 suspected cases.
  - Indonesia confirmed 10,614 new cases, bringing the total number to 1,263,299. 10,783 patients recovered, bringing the total number to 1,069,005. 183 patients deceased, bringing the tally to 34,152. 510 municipalities and regencies had reported at least one positive case.
  - 1,191,031 people had taken the first dose of vaccine while 668,914 had completed the process with the second dose.
- 20 February
  - 10,347,047 specimens had been tested from 6,871,210 people. There were 79,395 suspected cases.
  - Indonesia confirmed 8,054 new cases, bringing the total number to 1,271,353. 9,835 patients recovered, bringing the total number to 1,078,840. 164 patients deceased, bringing the tally to 34,316. 510 municipalities and regencies had reported at least one positive case.
  - 1,224,091 people had taken the first dose of vaccine while 732,634 had completed the process with the second dose.
- 21 February
  - 10,389,884 specimens had been tested from 6,900,519 people. There were 77,424 suspected cases.
  - Indonesia confirmed 7,300 new cases, bringing the total number to 1,278,653. 8,236 patients recovered, bringing the total number to 1,087,076. 173 patients deceased, bringing the tally to 34,489. 510 municipalities and regencies had reported at least one positive case.
  - 1,227,918 people had taken the first dose of vaccine while 736,710 had completed the process with the second dose.
  - The national government extended the large-scale social restrictions in Java and Bali until 8 March.
- 22 February
  - 10,436,446 specimens had been tested from 6,943,792 people. There were 81,037 suspected cases.
  - Indonesia confirmed 10,180 new cases, bringing the total number to 1,288,833. 9,918 patients recovered, bringing the total number to 1,096,994. 202 patients deceased, bringing the tally to 34,691. 510 municipalities and regencies had reported at least one positive case.
  - 1,244,215 people had taken the first dose of vaccine while 764,905 had completed the process with the second dose.
- 23 February
  - 10,501,877 specimens had been tested from 6,999,368 people. There were 78,616 suspected cases.
  - Indonesia confirmed 9,775 new cases, bringing the total number to 1,298,608. 7,996 patients recovered, bringing the total number to 1,104,990. 323 patients deceased, bringing the tally to 35,014. 510 municipalities and regencies had reported at least one positive case.
  - 1,269,905 people had taken the first dose of vaccine while 789,966 had completed the process with the second dose.
- 24 February
  - 10,574,891 specimens had been tested from 7,051,844 people. There were 77,512 suspected cases.
  - Indonesia confirmed 7,533 new cases, bringing the total number to 1,306,141. 7,735 patients recovered, bringing the total number to 1,112,725. 240 patients deceased, bringing the tally to 35,254. 510 municipalities and regencies had reported at least one positive case.
  - 1,363,138 people had taken the first dose of vaccine while 825,650 had completed the process with the second dose. For the first time, the number of people vaccinated against COVID-19 surpassed the official number of cases.
  - Vaccination for 5 million teachers was officially started with inoculations of 650 teachers and lecturers in Jakarta. With the commencement, Minister of Education and Culture Nadiem Makarim announced the possibility to reopen schools with limited attendance nationwide in July.
- 25 February
  - 10,644,435 specimens had been tested from 7,101,863 people. There were 77,293 suspected cases.
  - Indonesia confirmed 8,493 new cases, bringing the total number to 1,314,634. 8,686 patients recovered, bringing the total number to 1,121,411. 264 patients deceased, bringing the tally to 35,518. 510 municipalities and regencies had reported at least one positive case.
  - 1,461,920 people had taken the first dose of vaccine while 853,745 had completed the process with the second dose.
- 26 February
  - 10,708,262 specimens had been tested from 7,141,629 people. There were 75,822 suspected cases.
  - Indonesia confirmed 8,232 new cases, bringing the total number to 1,322,866. 7,261 patients recovered, bringing the total number to 1,128,672. 268 patients deceased, bringing the tally to 35,786. 510 municipalities and regencies had reported at least one positive case.
  - 1,583,581 people had taken the first dose of vaccine while 865,870 had completed the process with the second dose.
  - Minister of Health Budi Gunadi Sadikin allowed private corporations to self-vaccinate their workers. To facilitate the program, the Sinopharm BIBP and Moderna vaccines would be deployed.
  - Minister of Transportation Budi Karya Sumadi announced that the Port of Tanjung Priok would provide COVID-19 tests to passengers using Indonesia's own-made breath test kit called GeNose.
- 27 February
  - 10,763,757 specimens had been tested from 7,173,023 people. There were 78,746 suspected cases.
  - Indonesia confirmed 6,208 new cases, bringing the total number to 1,329,074. 7,382 patients recovered, bringing the total number to 1,136,054. 195 patients deceased, bringing the tally to 35,981. 510 municipalities and regencies had reported at least one positive case.
  - 1,616,165 people had taken the first dose of vaccine while 982,370 had completed the process with the second dose.
- 28 February
  - 10,799,191 specimens had been tested from 7,194,252 people. There were 71,668 suspected cases.
  - Indonesia confirmed 5,560 new cases, bringing the total number to 1,334,634. 6,649 patients recovered, bringing the total number to 1,142,703. 185 patients deceased, bringing the tally to 36,166. 510 municipalities and regencies had reported at least one positive case.
  - 1,691,724 people had taken the first dose of vaccine while 998,439 had completed the process with the second dose.

== March ==
- 1 March
  - 10,834,875 specimens had been tested from 7,213,192 people. There were 73,434 suspected cases.
  - Indonesia confirmed 6,680 new cases, bringing the total number to 1,341,314. 9,212 patients recovered, bringing the total number to 1,151,915. 159 patients deceased, bringing the tally to 36,325. 510 municipalities and regencies had reported at least one positive case.
  - 1,720,523 people had taken the first dose of vaccine while 1,002,218 had completed the process with the second dose.
- 2 March
  - 10,868,049 specimens had been tested from 7,243,182 people. There were 73,977 suspected cases.
  - Indonesia confirmed 5,712 new cases, bringing the total number to 1,347,026. 8,948 patients recovered, bringing the total number to 1,160,863. 193 patients deceased, bringing the tally to 36,518. 510 municipalities and regencies had reported at least one positive case.
  - 1,935,478 people had taken the first dose of vaccine, while 1,047,288 had completed the process with the second dose.
  - Exactly a year after two first COVID-19 cases, Indonesia reported its first two cases of the B117 variant which was first detected in the United Kingdom. Both were discovered in Karawang, West Java.
- 3 March
  - 10,946,722 RT-PCR and TCM specimens had been tested from 7,290,849 people. There were 69,631 suspected cases.
  - Indonesia confirmed 6,808 new cases, bringing the total number to 1,353,834. 9,053 patients recovered, bringing the total number to 1,169,916. 203 patients deceased, bringing the tally to 36,721. 510 municipalities and regencies had reported at least one positive case.
  - 2,104,967 people had taken the first dose of vaccine while 1,076,409 had completed the process with the second dose.
  - The Ministry of Health had officially included the antigen rapid tests positive results to the tally. For this day there were 1,471 tests conducted on the same number of people.
- 4 March
  - 11,011,244 specimens had been tested from 7,335,746 people. People tested using antigen rapid tests were included in this figure from this day on. There were 67,095 suspected cases.
  - Indonesia confirmed 7,264 new cases, bringing the total number to 1,361,098. 6,440 patients recovered, bringing the total number to 1,176,356. 176 patients deceased, bringing the tally to 36,897. 510 municipalities and regencies had reported at least one positive case.
  - 2,286,123 people had taken the first dose of vaccine while 1,100,228 had completed the process with the second dose.
- 5 March
  - 11,047,351 specimens had been tested from 7,350,641 people using RT-PCR, TCM, and antigen rapid tests. There were 66,546 suspected cases.
  - Indonesia confirmed 6,971 new cases, bringing the total number to 1,368,069. 6,331 patients recovered, bringing the total number to 1,182,687. 129 patients deceased, bringing the tally to 37,026. 510 municipalities and regencies had reported at least one positive case.
  - 2,413,615 people had taken the first dose of vaccine while 1,114,537 had completed the process with the second dose.
  - The national government extended the large-scale social restrictions in Java and Bali until 22 March 2021, with the measures also taking effect from 8 March in North Sumatra, South Sulawesi, and East Kalimantan.
- 6 March
  - 11,126,096 specimens had been tested from 7,420,374 people using RT-PCR, TCM, and antigen rapid tests. There were 66,525 suspected cases.
  - Indonesia confirmed 5,767 new cases, bringing the total number to 1,373,836. 6,823 patients recovered, bringing the total number to 1,189,510. 128 patients deceased, bringing the tally to 37,154. 510 municipalities and regencies had reported at least one positive case.
  - 2,552,265 people had taken the first dose of vaccine while 1,130,524 had completed the process with the second dose.
- 7 March
  - 11,148,477 specimens had been tested from 7,423,376 people using RT-PCR, TCM, and antigen rapid tests. There were 67,659 suspected cases.
  - Indonesia confirmed 5,826 new cases, bringing the total number to 1,379,662. 5,146 patients recovered, bringing the total number to 1,194,656. 112 patients deceased, bringing the tally to 37,266. 510 municipalities and regencies had reported at least one positive case.
  - 2,888,757 people had taken the first dose of vaccine while 1,133,787 had completed the process with the second dose. This covered at least one percent of Indonesia's population had received an inoculation.
- 8 March
  - 11,198,738 specimens had been tested from 7,461,213 people using RT-PCR, TCM, and antigen rapid tests. There were 64,914 suspected cases.
  - Indonesia confirmed 6,894 new cases, bringing the total number to 1,386,556. 8,725 patients recovered, bringing the total number to 1,203,381. 281 patients deceased, bringing the tally to 37,547. 510 municipalities and regencies had reported at least one positive case.
  - 3,098,025 people had taken the first dose of vaccine while 1,158,432 had completed the process with the second dose.
  - Indonesia received its first shipment of vaccines from the COVAX initiative with 1.1 million doses of the Oxford–AstraZeneca vaccine arriving on this day.
  - The Ministry of Health announced another four cases of the B117 variant in East Kalimantan, South Kalimantan, South Sumatra, and North Sumatra.
- 9 March
  - 11,226,592 specimens had been tested from 7,505,175 people using RT-PCR, TCM, and antigen rapid tests. There were 65,480 suspected cases.
  - Indonesia confirmed 6,389 new cases, bringing the total number to 1,392,945. 7,496 patients recovered, bringing the total number to 1,210,877. 210 patients deceased, bringing the tally to 37,757. 510 municipalities and regencies had reported at least one positive case.
  - 3,337,026 people had taken the first dose of vaccine while 1,197,772 had completed the process with the second dose.
  - At its press conference, the National Agency of Drug and Food Control (BPOM) announced it had published an emergency use authorization for the Oxford–AstraZeneca vaccine on 22 February, the second vaccine approved for use in the country.
- 10 March
  - 11,358,653 specimens had been tested from 7,566,800 people using RT-PCR, TCM, and antigen rapid tests; in the previous 24 hours, a record-breaking 132,061 tests were conducted. There were 63,128 suspected cases.
  - Indonesia confirmed 5,633 new cases, bringing the total number to 1,398,578. 5,556 patients recovered, bringing the total number to 1,216,433. 175 patients deceased, bringing the tally to 37,932. 510 municipalities and regencies had reported at least one positive case.
  - 3,574,698 people had taken the first dose of vaccine while 1,262,878 had completed the process with the second dose.
  - The government would provide GeNose tests at cinemas and reopen the industry. The Minister of Tourism and Creative Economy Sandiaga Uno also announced Chief of the Indonesian National Police Listyo Sigit Prabowo had given permission to hold mass gathering events such as music concerts, sport matches, meetings, conferences, and exhibitions.
- 11 March
  - 11,424,389 specimens had been tested from 7,616,365 people using RT-PCR, TCM, and antigen rapid tests. There were 61,523 suspected cases.
  - Indonesia confirmed 5,144 new cases, bringing the total number to 1,403,722. 8,170 patients recovered, bringing the total number to 1,224,603. 117 patients deceased, bringing the tally to 38,049. 510 municipalities and regencies had reported at least one positive case.
  - 3,696,059 people had taken the first dose of vaccine while 1,295,615 had completed the process with the second dose.
- 12 March
  - 11,481,307 specimens had been tested from 7,661,433 people using RT-PCR, TCM, and antigen rapid tests. There were 62,883 suspected cases.
  - Indonesia confirmed 6,412 new cases, bringing the total number to 1,410,134. 6,851 patients recovered, bringing the total number to 1,231,454. 180 patients deceased, bringing the tally to 38,229. 510 municipalities and regencies had reported at least one positive case.
  - 3,769,174 people had taken the first dose of vaccine while 1,339,362 had completed the process with the second dose.
  - The Eijkman Institute announced 48 cases of infection with SARS-CoV-2 virus variant N439K, with the first case detected in the country in December 2020.
- 13 March
  - 11,558,221 specimens had been tested from 7,711,589 people using RT-PCR, TCM, and antigen rapid tests. There were 61,103 suspected cases.
  - Indonesia confirmed 4,607 new cases, bringing the total number to 1,414,741. 6,016 patients recovered, bringing the total number to 1,237,470. 100 patients deceased, bringing the tally to 38,329. 510 municipalities and regencies had reported at least one positive case.
  - The number of new cases sank below 5,000 for the first time since 24 November 2020 (4,192); active cases number were the lowest since 15 January 2021 (138,942 this day, 138,238 then).
  - 3,985,596 people had taken the first dose of vaccine while 1,454,836 had completed the process with the second dose.
- 14 March
  - 11,596,046 specimens had been tested from 7,739,691 people using RT-PCR, TCM, and antigen rapid tests. There were 62,804 suspected cases.
  - Indonesia confirmed 4,714 new cases, bringing the total number to 1,419,455. 5,647 patients recovered, bringing the total number to 1,243,117. 97 patients deceased, bringing the tally to 38,426. 510 municipalities and regencies had reported at least one positive case.
  - 4,020,124 people had taken the first dose of vaccine while 1,460,222 had completed the process with the second dose.
  - The number of deaths per day dropped below 100 for the first time since 21 November 2020 (96).
- 15 March
  - 11,643,854 specimens had been tested from 7,781,193 people using RT-PCR, TCM, and antigen rapid tests. There were 63,957 suspected cases.
  - Indonesia confirmed 5,589 new cases, bringing the total number to 1,425,044. 6,830 patients recovered, bringing the total number to 1,249,947. 147 patients deceased, bringing the tally to 38,573. 510 municipalities and regencies had reported at least one positive case.
  - 4,166,862 people had taken the first dose of vaccine while 1,572,786 had completed the process with the second dose.
  - All six provinces on Java were in the top ten provinces with most confirmed cases simultaneously, the first time in almost a year.
  - Indonesia temporarily halted the distribution of the Oxford-AstraZeneca vaccine after reports of blood clot post vaccination in Europe.
  - At a hearing with the parliament, head of the National Agency of Drug and Food Control (BPOM) Penny Lukito announced four vaccines in use for the self-vaccination program for private employees: Sinopharm BIBP, Moderna, Sputnik V, and Novavax.
- 16 March
  - 11,719,480 specimens had been tested from 7,828,257 people using RT-PCR, TCM, and antigen rapid tests. There were 60,415 suspected cases.
  - Indonesia confirmed 5,414 new cases, bringing the total number to 1,430,458. 7,716 patients recovered, bringing the total number to 1,257,663. 180 patients deceased, bringing the tally to 38,753. 510 municipalities and regencies had reported at least one positive case.
  - 4,468,951 people had taken the first dose of vaccine while 1,716,749 had completed the process with the second dose.
  - Minister of Transportation Budi Karya Sumadi stated that Indonesia would not ban Eid al-Fitr related travel this year. The government had decided in February to reduce the public holidays from a total of 8 days (12 to 19 May) to just 5 days (12 to 16 May), in order to discourage people to travel. However, this was later cancelled and the government decided to ban mudik.
- 17 March
  - 11,795,460 specimens had been tested from 7,887,009 people using RT-PCR, TCM, and antigen rapid tests. There were 59,610 suspected cases.
  - Indonesia confirmed 6,825 new cases, bringing the total number to 1,437,283. 9,010 patients recovered, bringing the total number to 1,266,673. 162 patients deceased, bringing the tally to 38,915. 510 municipalities and regencies had reported at least one positive case.
  - 4,705,248 people had taken the first dose of vaccine while 1,876,140 had completed the process with the second dose.
  - Number of active cases decreased for the tenth consecutive day, the joint-longest record set before on 15 February 2021.
- 18 March
  - 11,871,197 specimens had been tested from 7,922,952 people using RT-PCR, TCM, and antigen rapid tests. There were 59,666 suspected cases.
  - Indonesia confirmed 6,570 new cases, bringing the total number to 1,443,853. 6,285 patients recovered, bringing the total number to 1,272,958. 227 patients deceased, bringing the tally to 39,142. 510 municipalities and regencies had reported at least one positive case.
  - 4,838,752 people had taken the first dose of vaccine while 1,948,531 had completed the process with the second dose.
- 19 March
  - 11,944,657 specimens had been tested from 7,968,915 people using RT-PCR, TCM, and antigen rapid tests. There were 59,564 suspected cases.
  - Indonesia confirmed 6,279 new cases, bringing the total number to 1,450,132. 6,007 patients recovered, bringing the total number to 1,278,965. 197 patients deceased, bringing the tally to 39,339. 510 municipalities and regencies had reported at least one positive case.
  - 5,124,948 people had taken the first dose of vaccine while 2,221,200 had completed the process with the second dose.
  - The national government extended the large-scale social restrictions until 5 April 2021, with the measures also taking effect in West Nusa Tenggara, East Nusa Tenggara, Central Kalimantan, South Kalimantan, and North Sulawesi. In addition, offline teaching in tertiary education institutions and arts and cultural events would be allowed.
  - The National Agency of Drug and Food Control (BPOM) authorized the resumption of distribution and use of the Oxford–AstraZeneca vaccine.
- 20 March
  - 12,014,357 specimens had been tested from 8,012,722 people using RT-PCR, TCM, and antigen rapid tests. There were 58,236 suspected cases.
  - Indonesia confirmed 5,656 new cases, bringing the total number to 1,455,788. 5,760 patients recovered, bringing the total number to 1,284,725. 108 patients deceased, bringing the tally to 39,447. 510 municipalities and regencies had reported at least one positive case.
  - 5,533,379 people had taken the first dose of vaccine while 2,301,978 had completed the process with the second dose.
- 21 March
  - 12,055,712 specimens had been tested from 8,036,026 people using RT-PCR, TCM, and antigen rapid tests. There were 59,992 suspected cases.
  - Indonesia confirmed 4,396 new cases, bringing the total number to 1,460,184. 6,065 patients recovered, bringing the total number to 1,290,790. 103 patients deceased, bringing the tally to 39,550. 510 municipalities and regencies had reported at least one positive case.
  - 5,567,280 people had taken the first dose of vaccine while 2,312,601 had completed the process with the second dose.
- 22 March
  - 12,099,467 specimens had been tested from 8,076,608 people using RT-PCR, TCM, and antigen rapid tests. There were 41,674 suspected cases.
  - Indonesia confirmed 5,744 new cases, bringing the total number to 1,465,928. 7,177 patients recovered, bringing the total number to 1,297,967. 161 patients deceased, bringing the tally to 39,711. 510 municipalities and regencies had reported at least one positive case.
  - 5,732,210 people had taken the first dose of vaccine while 2,494,422 had completed the process with the second dose.
- 23 March
  - 12,176,869 specimens had been tested from 8,126,733 people using RT-PCR, TCM, and antigen rapid tests. There were 44,848 suspected cases.
  - Indonesia confirmed 5,297 new cases, bringing the total number to 1,471,225. 6,954 patients recovered, bringing the total number to 1,304,921. 154 patients deceased, bringing the tally to 39,865. 510 municipalities and regencies had reported at least one positive case.
  - 5,978,251 people had taken the first dose of vaccine while 2,709,545 had completed the process with the second dose.
  - The Ministry of Health permitted the second dose of the CoronaVac vaccine for people under 60 to be administered up to 28 days after the first dose, when a strict gap of 14 days between the two doses could not be attained.
- 24 March
  - 12,249,147 specimens had been tested from 8,176,521 people using RT-PCR, TCM, and antigen rapid tests. There were 46,685 suspected cases.
  - Indonesia confirmed 5,227 new cases, bringing the total number to 1,476,452. 7,622 patients recovered, bringing the total number to 1,312,543. 118 patients deceased, bringing the tally to 39,983. 510 municipalities and regencies had reported at least one positive case.
  - 6,389,837 people had taken the first dose of vaccine while 2,941,016 had completed the process with the second dose.
- 25 March
  - 12,330,238 specimens had been tested from 8,229,683 people using RT-PCR, TCM, and antigen rapid tests. There were 48,914 suspected cases.
  - Indonesia confirmed 6,107 new cases, bringing the total number to 1,482,559. 4,656 patients recovered, bringing the total number to 1,317,199. 98 patients deceased, bringing the tally to 40,081. 510 municipalities and regencies had reported at least one positive case.
  - 6,730,456 people had taken the first dose of vaccine while 3,015,190 had completed the process with the second dose.
- 26 March
  - 12,401,797 specimens had been tested from 8,281,302 people using RT-PCR, TCM, and antigen rapid tests. There were 52,528 suspected cases.
  - Indonesia confirmed 4,982 new cases, bringing the total number to 1,487,541. 5,679 patients recovered, bringing the total number to 1,322,878. 85 patients deceased, bringing the tally to 40,166. 510 municipalities and regencies had reported at least one positive case.
  - 6,990,082 people had taken the first dose of vaccine while 3,152,612 had completed the process with the second dose.
  - The national government announced its decision to ban the mudik activities during Eid al-Fitr from 6 to 17 May to curb the spread of COVID-19. This policy was taken after the government previously stated that they would not ban the activity.
- 27 March
  - 12,469,345 specimens had been tested from 8,327,183 people using RT-PCR, TCM, and antigen rapid tests. There were 54,980 suspected cases.
  - Indonesia confirmed 4,461 new cases, bringing the total number to 1,492,002. 4,243 patients recovered, bringing the total number to 1,327,121. 198 patients deceased, bringing the tally to 40,364. 510 municipalities and regencies had reported at least one positive case.
  - 7,190,663 people had taken the first dose of vaccine while 3,235,027 had completed the process with the second dose.
  - North Sulawesi temporarily halted the administration of the Oxford–AstraZeneca vaccine after at least five percent of the 3,990 patients inoculated so far reported post-vaccination side effects.
- 28 March
  - 12,512,030 specimens had been tested from 8,357,821 people using RT-PCR, TCM, and antigen rapid tests. There were 57,858 suspected cases.
  - Indonesia confirmed 4,083 new cases, bringing the total number to 1,496,085. 4,279 patients recovered, bringing the total number to 1,331,400. 85 patients deceased, bringing the tally to 40,449. 510 municipalities and regencies had reported at least one positive case.
  - As of 18:00 WIB (UTC+7), 7,251,039 people had taken the first dose of vaccine while 3,246,809 had completed the process with the second dose.
- 29 March
  - 12,558,963 specimens had been tested from 8,396,863 people using RT-PCR, TCM, and antigen rapid tests. There were 59,473 suspected cases.
  - Indonesia confirmed 5,008 new cases, bringing the total number to 1,501,093. 5,418 patients recovered, bringing the total number to 1,336,818. 132 patients deceased, bringing the tally to 40,581. 510 municipalities and regencies had reported at least one positive case.
  - As of 18:00 WIB (UTC+7), 7,435,851 people had taken the first dose of vaccine while 3,330,639 had completed the process with the second dose.
- 30 March
  - 12,635,867 specimens had been tested from 8,445,150 people using RT-PCR, TCM, and antigen rapid tests. There were 60,671 suspected cases.
  - Indonesia confirmed 4,682 new cases, bringing the total number to 1,505,775. 5,877 patients recovered, bringing the total number to 1,342,695. 173 patients deceased, bringing the tally to 40,754. 510 municipalities and regencies had reported at least one positive case.
  - As of 18:00 WIB (UTC+7), 7,840,024 people had taken the first dose of vaccine while 3,561,192 had completed the process with the second dose.
  - The National Commission of Adverse Events Following Immunization (AEFI) recommended North Sulawesi to resume the use of the Oxford-AstraZeneca vaccine after determining that its side effects were light and did not require hospitalization.
- 31 March
  - 12,707,307 specimens had been tested from 8,490,864 people using RT-PCR, TCM, and antigen rapid tests. There were 62,210 suspected cases.
  - Indonesia confirmed 5,937 new cases, bringing the total number to 1,511,712. 5,635 patients recovered, bringing the total number to 1,348,330. 104 patients deceased, bringing the tally to 40,858. 510 municipalities and regencies had reported at least one positive case.
  - As of 18:00 WIB (UTC+7), 8,115,714 people had taken the first dose of vaccine while 3,717,081 had completed the process with the second dose.

== April ==
- 1 April
  - 12,780,101 specimens had been tested from 8,545,630 people using RT-PCR, TCM, and antigen rapid tests. There were 62,623 suspected cases.
  - Indonesia confirmed 6,142 new cases, bringing the total number to 1,517,854. 7,248 patients recovered, bringing the total number to 1,355,578. 196 patients deceased, bringing the tally to 41,054. 510 municipalities and regencies had reported at least one positive case.
  - As of 18:00 WIB (UTC+7), 8,371,577 people had taken the first dose of vaccine while 3,854,451 had completed the process with the second dose.
  - The Ministry of Health announced the postponement of the vaccination schedule for the general public to June or July as a result of vaccine shortage due to the export ban of the Oxford–AstraZeneca vaccine from India.
- 2 April
  - 12,836,596 specimens had been tested from 8,587,036 people using RT-PCR, TCM, and antigen rapid tests. There were 63,251 suspected cases.
  - Indonesia confirmed 5,325 new cases, bringing the total number to 1,523,179. 5,439 patients recovered, bringing the total number to 1,361,017. 97 patients deceased, bringing the tally to 41,151. 510 municipalities and regencies had reported at least one positive case.
  - As of 18:00 WIB (UTC+7), 8,424,729 people had taken the first dose of vaccine while 3,867,762 had completed the process with the second dose.
- 3 April
  - 12,876,662 specimens had been tested from 8,623,081 people using RT-PCR, TCM, and antigen rapid tests. There were 62,489 suspected cases.
  - Indonesia confirmed 4,345 new cases, bringing the total number to 1,527,524. 5,197 patients recovered, bringing the total number to 1,366,214. 91 patients deceased, bringing the tally to 41,242. 510 municipalities and regencies had reported at least one positive case.
  - As of 18:00 WIB (UTC+7), 8,544,910 people had taken the first dose of vaccine while 3,954,343 had completed the process with the second dose.
- 4 April
  - 12,913,152 specimens had been tested from 8,656,962 people using RT-PCR, TCM, and antigen rapid tests. There were 62,290 suspected cases.
  - Indonesia confirmed 6,731 new cases, bringing the total number to 1,534,255. 9,663 patients recovered, bringing the total number to 1,375,877. 427 patients deceased, bringing the tally to 41,669. 510 municipalities and regencies had reported at least one positive case.
  - As of 18:00 WIB (UTC+7), 8,634,321 people had taken the first dose of vaccine while 4,014,803 had completed the process with the second dose.
  - Banten broke West Java's record on 28 January 2021 for most deaths in 24 hours as 338 people died. It also broke Jakarta's record on 2 February 2021 for most recoveries in 24 hours; 6,279 people had survived from the disease.
  - East Java became the first province to pass 10,000 deaths.
- 5 April
  - 12,958,109 specimens had been tested from 8,695,309 people using RT-PCR, TCM, and antigen rapid tests. There were 61,133 suspected cases.
  - Indonesia confirmed 3,712 new cases, bringing the total number to 1,537,967. 5,800 patients recovered, bringing the total number to 1,381,677. 146 patients deceased, bringing the tally to 41,815. 510 municipalities and regencies had reported at least one positive case.
  - As of 18:00 WIB (UTC+7), 8,856,373 people had taken the first dose of vaccine while 4,230,800 had completed the process with the second dose.
  - The Ministry of Health announced the first case of the E484K variant in the country.
  - The national government extended the large-scale social restrictions until 19 April 2021, with the measures also taking effect in Aceh, Riau, South Sumatra, North Kalimantan, and Papua.
  - After the 2020 edition was cancelled due to the pandemic, the 2021 edition of Indonesia Masters Super 100 – originally to be played between 5 and 10 October 2021 – was also cancelled.
- 6 April
  - 13,036,151 specimens had been tested from 8,745,068 people using RT-PCR, TCM, and antigen rapid tests. There were 61,242 suspected cases.
  - Indonesia confirmed 4,549 new cases, bringing the total number to 1,542,516. 4,296 patients recovered, bringing the total number to 1,385,973. 162 patients deceased, bringing the tally to 41,977. 510 municipalities and regencies had reported at least one positive case.
  - As of 18:00 WIB (UTC+7), 9,021,106 people had taken the first dose of vaccine while 4,431,504 had completed the process with the second dose.
- 7 April
  - 13,113,647 specimens had been tested from 8,798,525 people using RT-PCR, TCM, and antigen rapid tests. There were 59,524 suspected cases.
  - Indonesia confirmed 4,860 new cases, bringing the total number to 1,547,376. 5,769 patients recovered, bringing the total number to 1,391,742. 87 patients deceased, bringing the tally to 42,064. 510 municipalities and regencies had reported at least one positive case.
  - As of 18:00 WIB (UTC+7), 9,196,299 people had taken the first dose of vaccine while 4,554,695 had completed the process with the second dose.
- 8 April
  - 13,187,063 specimens had been tested from 8,852,778 people using RT-PCR, TCM, and antigen rapid tests. There were 58,214 suspected cases.
  - Indonesia confirmed 5,504 new cases, bringing the total number to 1,552,880. 7,640 patients recovered, bringing the total number to 1,399,382. 163 patients deceased, bringing the tally to 42,227. 510 municipalities and regencies had reported at least one positive case.
  - As of 18:00 WIB (UTC+7), 9,373,590 people had taken the first dose of vaccine while 4,697,396 had completed the process with the second dose.
  - At a hearing with the parliament, Minister of Health Budi Gunadi Sadikin confirmed Indonesia in the foreseeable future would have received only 1.4 million doses of the Oxford–AstraZeneca vaccine, already delivered last month under the COVAX initiative, instead of the 104 million committed, due to export ban of the vials from India. Moreover, the state-owned vaccine manufacturer Bio Farma announced the firm had ordered 15 million doses of the Sinopharm BIBP vaccine, 22 million of the Sputnik V vaccine, and 5 million of Convidecia. All would be used for the self-vaccination program.
- 9 April
  - 13,259,775 specimens had been tested from 8,900,958 people using RT-PCR, TCM, and antigen rapid tests. There were 59,453 suspected cases.
  - Indonesia confirmed 5,265 new cases, bringing the total number to 1,558,145. 6,277 patients recovered, bringing the total number to 1,405,659. 121 patients deceased, bringing the tally to 42,348. 510 municipalities and regencies had reported at least one positive case.
  - As of 18:00 WIB (UTC+7), 9,808,744 people had taken the first dose of vaccine while 4,952,219 had completed the process with the second dose.
- 10 April
  - 13,323,866 specimens had been tested from 8,944,665 people using RT-PCR, TCM, and antigen rapid tests. There were 59,139 suspected cases.
  - Indonesia confirmed 4,723 new cases, bringing the total number to 1,562,868. 3,629 patients recovered, bringing the total number to 1,409,288. 95 patients deceased, bringing the tally to 42,443. 510 municipalities and regencies had reported at least one positive case.
  - As of 18:00 WIB (UTC+7), 10,002,264 people had taken the first dose of vaccine while 5,079,048 had completed the process with the second dose.
- 11 April
  - 13,365,972 specimens had been tested from 8,975,583 people using RT-PCR, TCM, and antigen rapid tests. There were 58,965 suspected cases.
  - Indonesia confirmed 4,127 new cases, bringing the total number to 1,566,995. 5,219 patients recovered, bringing the total number to 1,414,507. 87 patients deceased, bringing the tally to 42,530. 510 municipalities and regencies had reported at least one positive case.
  - As of 18:00 WIB (UTC+7), 10,048,814 people had taken the first dose of vaccine while 5,101,921 had completed the process with the second dose.
- 12 April
  - 13,412,303 specimens had been tested from 9,010,017 people using RT-PCR, TCM, and antigen rapid tests. There were 59,915 suspected cases.
  - Indonesia confirmed 4,829 new cases, bringing the total number to 1,571,824. 5,289 patients recovered, bringing the total number to 1,419,796. 126 patients deceased, bringing the tally to 42,656. 510 municipalities and regencies had reported at least one positive case.
  - As of 18:00 WIB (UTC+7), 10,279,346 people had taken the first dose of vaccine while 5,322,501 had completed the process with the second dose.
- 13 April
  - 13,489,825 specimens had been tested from 9,060,658 people using RT-PCR, TCM, and antigen rapid tests. There were 58,450 suspected cases.
  - Indonesia confirmed 5,702 new cases, bringing the total number to 1,577,526. 6,349 patients recovered, bringing the total number to 1,426,145. 126 patients deceased, bringing the tally to 42,782. 510 municipalities and regencies had reported at least one positive case.
  - As of 18:00 WIB (UTC+7), 10,377,007 people had taken the first dose of vaccine while 5,432,855 had completed the process with the second dose.
- 14 April
  - 13,563,983 specimens had been tested from 9,104,944 people using RT-PCR, TCM, and antigen rapid tests. There were 58,580 suspected cases.
  - Indonesia confirmed 5,656 new cases, bringing the total number to 1,583,182. 5,747 patients recovered, bringing the total number to 1,431,892. 124 patients deceased, bringing the tally to 42,906. 510 municipalities and regencies had reported at least one positive case.
  - As of 18:00 WIB (UTC+7), 10,481,178 people had taken the first dose of vaccine while 5,572,859 had completed the process with the second dose.
- 15 April
  - 13,638,566 specimens had been tested from 9,153,672 people using RT-PCR, TCM, and antigen rapid tests. There were 58,328 suspected cases.
  - Indonesia confirmed 6,177 new cases, bringing the total number to 1,589,359. 6,362 patients recovered, bringing the total number to 1,438,254. 167 patients deceased, bringing the tally to 43,073. 510 municipalities and regencies had reported at least one positive case.
  - As of 18:00 WIB (UTC+7), 10,599,742 people had taken the first dose of vaccine while 5,715,813 had completed the process with the second dose.
  - The Ministry of Health announced the first case of the B1525 variant in the country which had been confirmed in Batam, Riau Islands since February. Upon this, Indonesia had identified five variants of COVID-19, with the others being D614G, B117, N439K, and E484K.
- 16 April
  - 13,711,972 specimens had been tested from 9,203,770 people using RT-PCR, TCM, and antigen rapid tests. There were 58,999 suspected cases.
  - Indonesia confirmed 5,363 new cases, bringing the total number to 1,594,722. 5,975 patients recovered, bringing the total number to 1,444,229. 123 patients deceased, bringing the tally to 43,196. 510 municipalities and regencies had reported at least one positive case.
  - As of 18:00 WIB (UTC+7), 10,708,889 people had taken the first dose of vaccine while 5,821,888 had completed the process with the second dose.
- 17 April
  - 13,776,810 specimens had been tested from 9,248,725 people using RT-PCR, TCM, and antigen rapid tests. There were 60,699 suspected cases.
  - Indonesia confirmed 5,041 new cases, bringing the total number to 1,599,763. 5,963 patients recovered, bringing the total number to 1,450,192. 132 patients deceased, bringing the tally to 43,328. 510 municipalities and regencies had reported at least one positive case.
  - As of 18:00 WIB (UTC+7), 10,803,824 people had taken the first dose of vaccine while 5,890,790 had completed the process with the second dose.
- 18 April
  - 13,815,429 specimens had been tested from 9,280,005 people using RT-PCR, TCM, and antigen rapid tests. There were 61,694 suspected cases.
  - Indonesia confirmed 4,585 new cases, bringing the total number to 1,604,348. 4,873 patients recovered, bringing the total number to 1,455,065. 96 patients deceased, bringing the tally to 43,424. 510 municipalities and regencies had reported at least one positive case.
  - As of 18:00 WIB (UTC+7), 10,827,994 people had taken the first dose of vaccine while 5,911,343 had completed the process with the second dose.
  - Indonesia received 6 million bulk doses of CoronaVac on this day, bringing the total number to 59.5 million out of 140 million doses on firm order.
- 19 April
  - 13,870,157 specimens had been tested from 9,317,272 people using RT-PCR, TCM, and antigen rapid tests. There were 63,736 suspected cases.
  - Indonesia confirmed 4,952 new cases, bringing the total number to 1,609,300. 6,349 patients recovered, bringing the total number to 1,461,414. 143 patients deceased, bringing the tally to 43,567. 510 municipalities and regencies had reported at least one positive case.
  - As of 18:00 WIB (UTC+7), 10,971,604 people had taken the first dose of vaccine while 6,052,612 had completed the process with the second dose.
  - The national government extended the large-scale social restrictions until 3 May 2021, with the measures also taking effect in West Sumatra, Jambi, Bangka Belitung Islands, Lampung, and West Kalimantan.
- 20 April
  - 13,939,364 specimens had been tested from 9,365,379 people using RT-PCR, TCM, and antigen rapid tests. There were 63,581 suspected cases.
  - Indonesia confirmed 5,549 new cases, bringing the total number to 1,614,849. 6,728 patients recovered, bringing the total number to 1,468,142. 210 patients deceased, bringing the tally to 43,777. 510 municipalities and regencies had reported at least one positive case.
  - As of 18:00 WIB (UTC+7), 11,115,514 people had taken the first dose of vaccine while 6,158,748 had completed the process with the second dose.
- 21 April
  - 14,011,925 specimens had been tested from 9,412,427 people using RT-PCR, TCM, and antigen rapid tests. There were 62,411 suspected cases.
  - Indonesia confirmed 5,720 new cases, bringing the total number to 1,620,569. 7,314 patients recovered, bringing the total number to 1,475,456. 230 patients deceased, bringing the tally to 44,007. 510 municipalities and regencies had reported at least one positive case.
  - As of 18:00 WIB (UTC+7), 11,301,555 people had taken the first dose of vaccine while 6,341,931 had completed the process with the second dose.
  - Head of the Indonesian Chamber of Commerce and Industry Rosan Roeslani confirmed that at least 8.6 million employees from 17,387 companies will participate in the self-vaccination program starting on the third week of May using doses of the Sinopharm BIBP and Sputnik V vaccines.
  - Indonesians were banned from entering Japan, along with citizens from another 151 countries.
- 22 April
  - 14,090,518 specimens had been tested from 9,468,108 people using RT-PCR, TCM, and antigen rapid tests. There were 63,422 suspected cases.
  - Indonesia confirmed 6,243 new cases, bringing the total number to 1,626,812. 5,993 patients recovered, bringing the total number to 1,481,449. 165 patients deceased, bringing the tally to 44,172. 510 municipalities and regencies had reported at least one positive case.
  - As of 12:00 WIB (UTC+7), 11,431,972 people had taken the first dose of vaccine while 6,488,197 had completed the process with the second dose.
  - The Ministry of Health confirmed that it would receive another 3,852,000 doses of the Oxford-AstraZeneca vaccine by early May, the second shipment Indonesia received under the COVAX facility. Moreover, 10 to 15 million doses of Coronavac would also arrive by May.
  - The government tightened intercity travel requirements from 22 April to 24 May to curb the spread of the virus.
  - Indians fled to Indonesia as the country faced the second wave of the pandemic by recording more than 300,000 cases in a day.
- 23 April
  - 14,154,141 specimens had been tested from 9,509,667 people using RT-PCR, TCM, and antigen rapid tests. There were 65,421 suspected cases.
  - Indonesia confirmed 5,436 new cases, bringing the total number to 1,632,248. 5,920 patients recovered, bringing the total number to 1,487,369. 174 patients deceased, bringing the tally to 44,346. 510 municipalities and regencies had reported at least one positive case.
  - As of 18:00 WIB (UTC+7), 11,622,511 people had taken the first dose of vaccine while 6,699,327 had completed the process with the second dose.
  - Indonesia announced its decision to deny visas and entry for Indian citizens and foreign citizens who had been in India for the last 14 days from 25 April.
- 24 April
  - 14,221,892 specimens had been tested from 9,551,930 people using RT-PCR, TCM, and antigen rapid tests. There were 66,377 suspected cases.
  - Indonesia confirmed 4,544 new cases, bringing the total number to 1,636,792. 4,953 patients recovered, bringing the total number to 1,492,322. 154 patients deceased, bringing the tally to 44,500. 510 municipalities and regencies had reported at least one positive case.
  - As of 18:00 WIB (UTC+7), 11,717,806 people had taken the first dose of vaccine while 6,798,241 had completed the process with the second dose.
  - The number of active cases fell down below 100,000 for the first time since 18 December 2020.
- 25 April
  - 14,264,611 specimens had been tested from 9,584,455 people using RT-PCR, TCM, and antigen rapid tests. There were 67,312 suspected cases.
  - Indonesia confirmed 4,402 new cases, bringing the total number to 1,641,194. 3,804 patients recovered, bringing the total number to 1,496,126. 94 patients deceased, bringing the tally to 44,594. 510 municipalities and regencies had reported at least one positive case.
  - As of 18:00 WIB (UTC+7), 11,740,819 people had taken the first dose of vaccine while 6,829,415 had completed the process with the second dose.
- 26 April
  - 14,264,611 specimens had been tested from 9,584,455 people using RT-PCR, TCM, and antigen rapid tests. There were 68,297 suspected cases.
  - Indonesia confirmed 5,944 new cases, bringing the total number to 1,647,138. 5,589 patients recovered, bringing the total number to 1,501,715. 177 patients deceased, bringing the tally to 44,771. 510 municipalities and regencies had reported at least one positive case.
  - As of 18:00 WIB (UTC+7), 11,871,858 people had taken the first dose of vaccine while 7,023,351 had completed the process with the second dose.
  - The provincial government of Jakarta linked the recent increase of new COVID-19 cases in Jakarta to office clusters, most of which had had its workers already vaccinated.
- 27 April
  - 14,393,110 specimens had been tested from 9,673,217 people using RT-PCR, TCM, and antigen rapid tests. There were 65,911 suspected cases.
  - Indonesia confirmed 4,656 new cases, bringing the total number to 1,651,794. 4,884 patients recovered, bringing the total number to 1,506,599. 168 patients deceased, bringing the tally to 44,939. 510 municipalities and regencies had reported at least one positive case.
  - As of 18:00 WIB (UTC+7), 12,015,172 people had taken the first dose of vaccine while 7,214,534 had completed the process with the second dose.
  - An Indonesian man who just arrived from India was caught bribing two staff in Soekarno–Hatta International Airport. He paid as much as Rp6.5 million to avoid mandatory quarantine.
- 28 April
  - 14,466,393 specimens had been tested from 9,714,274 people using RT-PCR, TCM, and antigen rapid tests. There were 66,005 suspected cases.
  - Indonesia confirmed 5,241 new cases, bringing the total number to 1,657,035. 4,818 patients recovered, bringing the total number to 1,511,417. 177 patients deceased, bringing the tally to 45,116. 510 municipalities and regencies had reported at least one positive case.
  - As of 18:00 WIB (UTC+7), 12,149,637 people had taken the first dose of vaccine while 7,411,095 had completed the process with the second dose.
  - Regional Police of North Sumatra arrested six medical officers on duty in Kualanamu International Airport for reusing used antigen test kits.
- 29 April
  - 14,542,213 specimens had been tested from 9,769,757 people using RT-PCR, TCM, and antigen rapid tests. There were 66,295 suspected cases.
  - Indonesia confirmed 5,833 new cases, bringing the total number to 1,662,868. 6,015 patients recovered, bringing the total number to 1,517,432. 218 patients deceased, bringing the tally to 45,334. 510 municipalities and regencies had reported at least one positive case.
  - As of 18:00 WIB (UTC+7), 12,306,015 people had taken the first dose of vaccine while 7,583,443 had completed the process with the second dose.
- 30 April
  - 14,619,439 specimens had been tested from 9,821,421 people using RT-PCR, TCM, and antigen rapid tests. There were 67,208 suspected cases.
  - Indonesia confirmed 5,500 new cases, bringing the total number to 1,668,368. 5,202 patients recovered, bringing the total number to 1,522,634. 187 patients deceased, bringing the tally to 45,521. 510 municipalities and regencies had reported at least one positive case.
  - As of 18:00 WIB (UTC+7), 12,421,513 people had taken the first dose of vaccine while 7,646,284 had completed the process with the second dose.
  - The National Agency of Drug and Food Control (BPOM) issued an emergency use authorization for the Sinopharm BIBP vaccine.

== May ==
- 1 May
  - 14,682,656 specimens had been tested from 9,863,143 people using RT-PCR, TCM, and antigen rapid tests. There were 69,943 suspected cases.
  - Indonesia confirmed 4,512 new cases, bringing the total number to 1,672,880. 4,344 patients recovered, bringing the total number to 1,526,978. 131 patients deceased, bringing the tally to 45,652. 510 municipalities and regencies had reported at least one positive case.
  - As of 18:00 WIB (UTC+7), 12,456,424 people had taken the first dose of vaccine while 7,678,485 had completed the process with the second dose.
  - 500,000 doses of the Sinopharm BIBP vaccine donated by the United Arab Emirates government arrived on this day; this was the first shipment of the vaccine received by Indonesia.
- 2 May
  - 14,722,614 specimens had been tested from 9,895,532 people using RT-PCR, TCM, and antigen rapid tests. There were 73,065 suspected cases.
  - Indonesia confirmed 4,394 new cases, bringing the total number to 1,677,274. 3,740 patients recovered, bringing the total number to 1,530,718. 144 patients deceased, bringing the tally to 45,796. 510 municipalities and regencies had reported at least one positive case.
  - As of 18:00 WIB (UTC+7), 12,468,666 people had taken the first dose of vaccine while 7,703,110 had completed the process with the second dose.
- 3 May
  - 14,770,813 specimens had been tested from 9,931,245 people using RT-PCR, TCM, and antigen rapid tests. There were 75,355 suspected cases.
  - Indonesia confirmed 4,730 new cases, bringing the total number to 1,682,004. 4,773 patients recovered, bringing the total number to 1,535,491. 153 patients deceased, bringing the tally to 45,949. 510 municipalities and regencies had reported at least one positive case.
  - As of 18:00 WIB (UTC+7), 12,571,371 people had taken the first dose of vaccine while 7,850,407 had completed the process with the second dose.
  - Government of Jakarta was criticized due to the lack of preparation to anticipate the crowd occurred in Tanah Abang market.
  - The Ministry of Health announced the first case of two variants from India and South Africa, which are B1617 and B1351, in Jakarta and Bali respectively. Upon this, Indonesia had identified seven variants of COVID-19, with the others being D614G, B117, N439K, E484K, and B1525.
  - The national government extended the large-scale social restrictions until 17 May 2021, with the measures also taking effect in Riau Islands, Bengkulu, Central Sulawesi, Southeast Sulawesi, and West Papua.
- 4 May
  - 14,846,698 specimens had been tested from 9,982,781 people using RT-PCR, TCM, and antigen rapid tests. There were 77,804 suspected cases.
  - Indonesia confirmed 4,369 new cases, bringing the total number to 1,686,373. 5,658 patients recovered, bringing the total number to 1,541,149. 188 patients deceased, bringing the tally to 46,137. 510 municipalities and regencies had reported at least one positive case.
  - As of 18:00 WIB (UTC+7), 12,698,828 people had taken the first dose of vaccine while 8,002,236 had completed the process with the second dose.
  - In the last four months, 200 out of 14,000 repatriated Indonesian immigrant workers from Malaysia were tested positive for COVID-19 in Riau Islands. In addition, 34 Indonesian migrant workers from several countries in Southeast Asia were also tested positive in Surabaya.
- 5 May
  - 14,926,016 specimens had been tested from 10,033,957 people using RT-PCR, TCM, and antigen rapid tests. There were 76,660 suspected cases.
  - Indonesia confirmed 5,285 new cases, bringing the total number to 1,691,658. 5,943 patients recovered, bringing the total number to 1,547,092. 212 patients deceased, bringing the tally to 46,349. 510 municipalities and regencies had reported at least one positive case.
  - As of 18:00 WIB (UTC+7), 12,851,144 people had taken the first dose of vaccine while 8,165,862 had completed the process with the second dose.
  - Jakarta expanded its vaccination program to include the general public at its dense and poor neighborhoods.
- 6 May
  - 15,002,289 specimens had been tested from 10,084,079 people using RT-PCR, TCM, and antigen rapid tests. There were 77,775 suspected cases.
  - Indonesia confirmed 5,647 new cases, bringing the total number to 1,697,305. 5,440 patients recovered, bringing the total number to 1,552,532. 147 patients deceased, bringing the tally to 46,496. 510 municipalities and regencies had reported at least one positive case.
  - As of 18:00 WIB (UTC+7), 13,027,958 people had taken the first dose of vaccine while 8,338,517 had completed the process with the second dose.
  - The ban on mudik travel officially commenced on this day and would last until 17 May.
- 7 May
  - 15,078,279 specimens had been tested from 10,130,714 people using RT-PCR, TCM, and antigen rapid tests. There were 84,430 suspected cases.
  - Indonesia confirmed 6,327 new cases, bringing the total number to 1,703,632. 5,891 patients recovered, bringing the total number to 1,558,423. 167 patients deceased, bringing the tally to 46,663. 510 municipalities and regencies had reported at least one positive case.
  - As of 18:00 WIB (UTC+7), 13,179,997 people had taken the first dose of vaccine while 8,485,360 had completed the process with the second dose.
  - Two out of 85 Chinese foreign workers who arrived at Soekarno–Hatta International Airport from Shenzhen on 4 May using a charter flight by China Southern Airlines were tested positive for COVID-19.
  - Two men in Bekasi and Surabaya were given the unofficial title of "Mask Ambassador" and "COVID-19 Ambassador" after the videos of them mocking people wearing mask in a mosque and mall went viral on social media. This decision was criticized by the public.
- 8 May
  - 15,152,826 specimens had been tested from 10,175,419 people using RT-PCR, TCM, and antigen rapid tests. There were 86,552 suspected cases.
  - Indonesia confirmed 6,130 new cases, bringing the total number to 1,709,762. 5,494 patients recovered, bringing the total number to 1,563,917. 179 patients deceased, bringing the tally to 46,842. 510 municipalities and regencies had reported at least one positive case.
  - As of 18:00 WIB (UTC+7), 13,320,686 people had taken the first dose of vaccine while 8,611,464 had completed the process with the second dose.
  - Indonesia received 1,389,600 doses of the Oxford–AstraZeneca vaccine under the COVAX facility.
- 9 May
  - 15,201,727 specimens had been tested from 10,205,668 people using RT-PCR, TCM, and antigen rapid tests. There were 86,846 suspected cases.
  - Indonesia confirmed 3,922 new cases, bringing the total number to 1,713,684. 4,360 patients recovered, bringing the total number to 1,568,277. 170 patients deceased, bringing the tally to 47,012. 510 municipalities and regencies had reported at least one positive case.
  - As of 18:00 WIB (UTC+7), 13,348,652 people had taken the first dose of vaccine while 8,643,136 had completed the process with the second dose.
- 10 May
  - 15,251,210 specimens had been tested from 10,237,631 people using RT-PCR, TCM, and antigen rapid tests. There were 89,231 suspected cases.
  - Indonesia confirmed 4,891 new cases, bringing the total number to 1,718,575. 6,338 patients recovered, bringing the total number to 1,574,615. 206 patients deceased, bringing the tally to 47,218. 510 municipalities and regencies had reported at least one positive case.
  - As of 18:00 WIB (UTC+7), 13,512,789 people had taken the first dose of vaccine while 8,804,267 had completed the process with the second dose.
  - The National Commission of Adverse Events Following Immunization (AEFI) said there was no certainty that the man who died hours after he was vaccinated with the Oxford-AstraZeneca vaccine in Jakarta was caused by the vaccine.
- 11 May
  - 15,326,626 specimens had been tested from 10,282,721 people using RT-PCR, TCM, and antigen rapid tests. There were 87,743 suspected cases.
  - Indonesia confirmed 5,021 new cases, bringing the total number to 1,723,596. 5,592 patients recovered, bringing the total number to 1,580,207. 247 patients deceased, bringing the tally to 47,465. 510 municipalities and regencies had reported at least one positive case.
  - As of 18:00 WIB (UTC+7), 13,646,960 people had taken the first dose of vaccine while 8,887,835 had completed the process with the second dose.
- 12 May
  - 15,389,884 specimens had been tested from 10,321,361 people using RT-PCR, TCM, and antigen rapid tests. There were 87,034 suspected cases.
  - Indonesia confirmed 4,608 new cases, bringing the total number to 1,728,204. 4,671 patients recovered, bringing the total number to 1,584,878. 152 patients deceased, bringing the tally to 47,617. 510 municipalities and regencies had reported at least one positive case.
  - As of 18:00 WIB (UTC+7), 13,691,060 people had taken the first dose of vaccine while 8,918,090 had completed the process with the second dose.
- 13 May
  - 15,421,434 specimens had been tested from 10,343,074 people using RT-PCR, TCM, and antigen rapid tests. There were 87,578 suspected cases.
  - Indonesia confirmed 3,448 new cases, bringing the total number to 1,731,652. 4,201 patients recovered, bringing the total number to 1,589,079. 99 patients deceased, bringing the tally to 47,716. 510 municipalities and regencies had reported at least one positive case.
  - As of 18:00 WIB (UTC+7), 13,696,439 people had taken the first dose of vaccine while 8,919,255 had completed the process with the second dose.
- 14 May
  - 15,421,434 specimens had been tested from 10,343,074 people using RT-PCR, TCM, and antigen rapid tests. There were 86,842 suspected cases.
  - Indonesia confirmed 2,633 new cases, bringing the total number to 1,734,285. 3,807 patients recovered, bringing the total number to 1,592,886. 107 patients deceased, bringing the tally to 47,823. 510 municipalities and regencies had reported at least one positive case.
  - As of 18:00 WIB (UTC+7), 13,699,572 people had taken the first dose of vaccine while 8,921,284 had completed the process with the second dose.
  - On this day, at least 39,000 people visited Ancol Dreamland. This received criticism and raised concern on COVID-19 cluster.
- 15 May
  - 15,469,561 specimens had been tested from 10,381,538 people using RT-PCR, TCM, and antigen rapid tests. There were 84,063 suspected cases.
  - Indonesia confirmed 2,385 new cases, bringing the total number to 1,736,670. 4,181 patients recovered, bringing the total number to 1,597,067. 144 patients deceased, bringing the tally to 47,967. 510 municipalities and regencies had reported at least one positive case.
  - As of 18:00 WIB (UTC+7), 13,724,327 people had taken the first dose of vaccine while 8,959,382 had completed the process with the second dose.
  - The national government extended the large-scale social restrictions in the current 30 provinces until 31 May 2021.
- 16 May
  - 15,507,034 specimens had been tested from 10,409,178 people using RT-PCR, TCM, and antigen rapid tests. There were 81,809 suspected cases.
  - Indonesia confirmed 3,080 new cases, bringing the total number to 1,739,750. 3,790 patients recovered, bringing the total number to 1,600,857. 126 patients deceased, bringing the tally to 48,093. 510 municipalities and regencies had reported at least one positive case.
  - As of 18:00 WIB (UTC+7), 13,736,779 people had taken the first dose of vaccine while 8,970,021 had completed the process with the second dose.
  - The Ministry of Health temporarily halted the distribution of 448,480 doses of the Oxford-AstraZeneca vaccine batch CTMAV547 vaccine.
  - Several beaches in Indonesia were crowded during Eid al-Fitr, raising concern on COVID-19 cases spike.
- 17 May
  - 15,552,687 specimens had been tested from 10,446,166 people using RT-PCR, TCM, and antigen rapid tests. There were 79,815 suspected cases.
  - Indonesia confirmed 4,295 new cases, bringing the total number to 1,744,045. 5,754 patients recovered, bringing the total number to 1,606,611. 212 patients deceased, bringing the tally to 48,305. 510 municipalities and regencies had reported at least one positive case.
  - As of 18:00 WIB (UTC+7), 13,827,284 people had taken the first dose of vaccine while 9,093,271 had completed the process with the second dose.
  - An elderly in Jakarta died after being vaccinated with the Oxford-AstraZeneca vaccine, the second case in less than two weeks in the province.
- 18 May
  - 15,632,435 specimens had been tested from 10,489,670 people using RT-PCR, TCM, and antigen rapid tests. There were 76,827 suspected cases.
  - Indonesia confirmed 4,295 new cases, bringing the total number to 1,748,230. 5,754 patients recovered, bringing the total number to 1,612,239. 212 patients deceased, bringing the tally to 48,477. 510 municipalities and regencies had reported at least one positive case.
  - As of 18:00 WIB (UTC+7), 13,984,997 people had taken the first dose of vaccine while 9,275,493 had completed the process with the second dose.
- 19 May
  - 15,717,414 specimens had been tested from 10,542,828 people using RT-PCR, TCM, and antigen rapid tests. There were 73,807 suspected cases.
  - Indonesia confirmed 4,871 new cases, bringing the total number to 1,753,101. 4,364 patients recovered, bringing the total number to 1,616,603. 192 patients deceased, bringing the tally to 48,669. 510 municipalities and regencies had reported at least one positive case.
  - As of 18:00 WIB (UTC+7), 14,194,333 people had taken the first dose of vaccine while 9,427,529 had completed the process with the second dose.
- 20 May
  - 15,812,849 specimens had been tested from 10,598,569 people using RT-PCR, TCM, and antigen rapid tests. There were 75,168 suspected cases.
  - Indonesia confirmed 5,797 new cases, bringing the total number to 1,758,898. 4,969 patients recovered, bringing the total number to 1,621,572. 218 patients deceased, bringing the tally to 48,887. 510 municipalities and regencies had reported at least one positive case.
  - As of 18:00 WIB (UTC+7), 14,447,581 people had taken the first dose of vaccine while 9,579,852 had completed the process with the second dose.
- 21 May
  - 15,904,901 specimens had been tested from 10,670,344 people using RT-PCR, TCM, and antigen rapid tests. There were 77,431 suspected cases.
  - Indonesia confirmed 5,746 new cases, bringing the total number to 1,764,644. 4,570 patients recovered, bringing the total number to 1,626,142. 186 patients deceased, bringing the tally to 49,073. 510 municipalities and regencies had reported at least one positive case.
  - As of 18:00 WIB (UTC+7), 14,676,181 people had taken the first dose of vaccine while 9,745,828 had completed the process with the second dose.
  - Regional Police of North Sumatra arrested civil servants working in the Public Health Office of North Sumatra for selling supposed-to-be-free vaccines to people.
- 22 May
  - 15,986,717 specimens had been tested from 10,712,109 people using RT-PCR, TCM, and antigen rapid tests. There were 77,996 suspected cases.
  - Indonesia confirmed 5,296 new cases, bringing the total number to 1,769,940. 3,353 patients recovered, bringing the total number to 1,629,495. 132 patients deceased, bringing the tally to 49,205. 510 municipalities and regencies had reported at least one positive case.
  - As of 18:00 WIB (UTC+7), 14,857,871 people had taken the first dose of vaccine while 9,852,744 had completed the process with the second dose.
- 23 May
  - 16,059,675 specimens had been tested from 10,765,788 people using RT-PCR, TCM, and antigen rapid tests. There were 82,305 suspected cases.
  - Indonesia confirmed 5,280 new cases, bringing the total number to 1,775,220. 3,550 patients recovered, bringing the total number to 1,633,045. 123 patients deceased, bringing the tally to 49,328. 510 municipalities and regencies had reported at least one positive case.
  - As of 18:00 WIB (UTC+7), 14,895,944 people had taken the first dose of vaccine while 9,880,317 had completed the process with the second dose.
- 24 May
  - 16,125,144 specimens had been tested from 10,820,194 people using RT-PCR, TCM, and antigen rapid tests. There were 90,465 suspected cases.
  - Indonesia confirmed 5,907 new cases, bringing the total number to 1,781,127. 5,234 patients recovered, bringing the total number to 1,638,279. 127 patients deceased, bringing the tally to 49,455. 510 municipalities and regencies had reported at least one positive case.
  - As of 18:00 WIB (UTC+7), 14,905,488 people had taken the first dose of vaccine while 9,905,922 had completed the process with the second dose.
- 25 May
  - 16,209,568 specimens had been tested from 10,882,055 people using RT-PCR, TCM, and antigen rapid tests. There were 92,350 suspected cases.
  - Indonesia confirmed 5,060 new cases, bringing the total number to 1,786,187. 3,795 patients recovered, bringing the total number to 1,642,074. 172 patients deceased, bringing the tally to 49,627. 510 municipalities and regencies had reported at least one positive case.
  - As of 18:00 WIB (UTC+7), 15,311,917 people had taken the first dose of vaccine while 10,124,773 had completed the process with the second dose.
  - Eight million doses of CoronaVac arrived in Indonesia.
- 26 May
  - 16,209,568 specimens had been tested from 10,882,055 people using RT-PCR, TCM, and antigen rapid tests. There were 90,901 suspected cases.
  - Indonesia confirmed 5,060 new cases, bringing the total number to 1,791,221. 3,795 patients recovered, bringing the total number to 1,645,263. 172 patients deceased, bringing the tally to 49,771. 510 municipalities and regencies had reported at least one positive case.
  - As of 18:00 WIB (UTC+7), 15,524,152 people had taken the first dose of vaccine while 10,235,312 had completed the process with the second dose.
- 27 May
  - 16,372,837 specimens had been tested from 11,000,759 people using RT-PCR, TCM, and antigen rapid tests. There were 97,733 suspected cases.
  - Indonesia confirmed 6,278 new cases, bringing the total number to 1,797,499. 3,924 patients recovered, bringing the total number to 1,649,187. 136 patients deceased, bringing the tally to 49,907. 510 municipalities and regencies had reported at least one positive case.
  - As of 18:00 WIB (UTC+7), 15,825,410 people had taken the first dose of vaccine while 10,427,444 had completed the process with the second dose.
- 28 May
  - 16,483,519 specimens had been tested from 11,073,851 people using RT-PCR, TCM, and antigen rapid tests; in the previous 24 hours, 110,682 tests were conducted, the most since 10 March 2021. There were 103,383 suspected cases.
  - Indonesia confirmed 5,862 new cases, bringing the total number to 1,803,361. 5,370 patients recovered, bringing the total number to 1,654,557. 193 patients deceased, bringing the tally to 50,100. 510 municipalities and regencies had reported at least one positive case.
  - As of 18:00 WIB (UTC+7), 16,059,712 people had taken the first dose of vaccine while 10,511,733 had completed the process with the second dose.
  - The Ministry of Health resumed the usage and distribution of the Oxford-AstraZeneca vaccine batch CTMAV547 vaccine.
  - Indonesia passed 50,000 deaths, becoming the first country in Southeast Asia, third in Asia, and 18th in the world to achieve the grim milestone.
- 29 May
  - 16,589,465 specimens had been tested from 11,145,685 people using RT-PCR, TCM, and antigen rapid tests. There were 105,085 suspected cases.
  - Indonesia confirmed 6,565 new cases, bringing the total number to 1,809,926. 5,417 patients recovered, bringing the total number to 1,659,974. 162 patients deceased, bringing the tally to 50,262. 510 municipalities and regencies had reported at least one positive case.
  - As of 18:00 WIB (UTC+7), 16,256,748 people had taken the first dose of vaccine while 10,570,680 had completed the process with the second dose.
- 30 May
  - 16,660,482 specimens had been tested from 11,197,817 people using RT-PCR, TCM, and antigen rapid tests. There were 105,518 suspected cases.
  - Indonesia confirmed 6,115 new cases, bringing the total number to 1,816,041. 4,024 patients recovered, bringing the total number to 1,663,998. 142 patients deceased, bringing the tally to 50,404. 510 municipalities and regencies had reported at least one positive case.
  - As of 18:00 WIB (UTC+7), 16,272,611 people had taken the first dose of vaccine while 10,583,782 had completed the process with the second dose.
- 31 May
  - 16,728,343 specimens had been tested from 11,251,308 people using RT-PCR, TCM, and antigen rapid tests. There were 56,125 suspected cases.
  - Indonesia confirmed 6,115 new cases, bringing the total number to 1,821,703. 4,024 patients recovered, bringing the total number to 1,669,119. 142 patients deceased, bringing the tally to 50,578. 510 municipalities and regencies had reported at least one positive case.
  - As of 18:00 WIB (UTC+7), 16,521,846 people had taken the first dose of vaccine while 10,697,145 had completed the process with the second dose.
  - Eight million doses of CoronaVac arrived in Indonesia.

== June ==
- 1 June
  - 16,728,343 specimens had been tested from 11,251,308 people using RT-PCR, TCM, and antigen rapid tests. There were 61,108 suspected cases.
  - Indonesia confirmed 4,824 new cases, bringing the total number to 1,826,527. 5,360 patients recovered, bringing the total number to 1,674,479. 145 patients deceased, bringing the tally to 50,723. 510 municipalities and regencies had reported at least one positive case.
  - As of 18:00 WIB (UTC+7), 16,567,890 people had taken the first dose of vaccine while 10,720,371 had completed the process with the second dose.
  - The national government extended the large-scale social restrictions until 14 June 2021, with the measures also taking effect in West Sulawesi, Gorontalo, Maluku, and North Maluku. With this, all provinces in Indonesia would apply the restrictions.
- 2 June
  - 16,869,118 specimens had been tested from 11,352,639 people using RT-PCR, TCM, and antigen rapid tests. There were 63,643 suspected cases.
  - Indonesia confirmed 5,246 new cases, bringing the total number to 1,831,773. 6,022 patients recovered, bringing the total number to 1,680,501. 185 patients deceased, bringing the tally to 50,908. 510 municipalities and regencies had reported at least one positive case.
  - As of 18:00 WIB (UTC+7), 16,809,187 people had taken the first dose of vaccine while 10,876,402 had completed the process with the second dose.
- 3 June
  - 16,964,318 specimens had been tested from 11,411,006 people using RT-PCR, TCM, and antigen rapid tests. There were 70,185 suspected cases.
  - Indonesia confirmed 5,353 new cases, bringing the total number to 1,837,126. 11,092 patients recovered, bringing the total number to 1,691,593. 187 patients deceased, bringing the tally to 51,095. 510 municipalities and regencies had reported at least one positive case.
  - As of 18:00 WIB (UTC+7), 17,104,081 people had taken the first dose of vaccine while 11,002,445 had completed the process with the second dose.
  - West Java broke Banten's record on 4 April 2021 for most recoveries in 24 hours as 7,641 people recovered.
  - West Kalimantan became the last province to pass 100 deaths.
- 4 June
  - 17,082,313 specimens had been tested from 11,476,213 people using RT-PCR, TCM, and antigen rapid tests. There were 74,774 suspected cases.
  - Indonesia confirmed 6,486 new cases, bringing the total number to 1,843,612. 5,950 patients recovered, bringing the total number to 1,697,543. 201 patients deceased, bringing the tally to 51,296. 510 municipalities and regencies had reported at least one positive case.
  - As of 18:00 WIB (UTC+7), 17,366,272 people had taken the first dose of vaccine while 11,069,682 had completed the process with the second dose.
- 5 June
  - 17,171,338 specimens had been tested from 11,532,985 people using RT-PCR, TCM, and antigen rapid tests. There were 81,552 suspected cases.
  - Indonesia confirmed 6,594 new cases, bringing the total number to 1,850,206. 4,241 patients recovered, bringing the total number to 1,701,784. 153 patients deceased, bringing the tally to 51,449. 510 municipalities and regencies had reported at least one positive case.
  - As of 18:00 WIB (UTC+7), 17,566,676 people had taken the first dose of vaccine while 11,123,649 had completed the process with the second dose.
  - 313,100 doses of the Oxford–AstraZeneca vaccine arrived in Indonesia.
- 6 June
  - 17,235,561 specimens had been tested from 11,582,225 people using RT-PCR, TCM, and antigen rapid tests. There were 85,998 suspected cases.
  - Indonesia confirmed 5,832 new cases, bringing the total number to 1,856,038. 4,187 patients recovered, bringing the total number to 1,705,971. 163 patients deceased, bringing the tally to 51,612. 510 municipalities and regencies had reported at least one positive case.
  - As of 18:00 WIB (UTC+7), 17,611,642 people had taken the first dose of vaccine while 11,127,057 had completed the process with the second dose.
  - Travellers who wanted to cross the Suramadu Bridge had to perform swab test and show their documents due to COVID-19 cases spike in Bangkalan.
- 7 June
  - 17,299,617 specimens had been tested from 11,633,720 people using RT-PCR, TCM, and antigen rapid tests. There were 91,269 suspected cases.
  - Indonesia confirmed 6,993 new cases, bringing the total number to 1,863,031. 5,594 patients recovered, bringing the total number to 1,711,565. 191 patients deceased, bringing the tally to 51,803. 510 municipalities and regencies had reported at least one positive case.
  - As of 18:00 WIB (UTC+7), 17,753,205 people had taken the first dose of vaccine while 11,230,614 had completed the process with the second dose.
- 8 June
  - 17,401,548 specimens had been tested from 11,702,904 people using RT-PCR, TCM, and antigen rapid tests. There were 94,682 suspected cases.
  - Indonesia confirmed 6,294 new cases, bringing the total number to 1,869,325. 5,805 patients recovered, bringing the total number to 1,717,370. 189 patients deceased, bringing the tally to 51,992. 510 municipalities and regencies had reported at least one positive case.
  - As of 18:00 WIB (UTC+7), 18,405,809 people had taken the first dose of vaccine while 11,396,021 had completed the process with the second dose.
  - Jakarta expanded its vaccination program to all residents ages 18 and above.
- 9 June
  - 17,509,373 specimens had been tested from 11,773,437 people using RT-PCR, TCM, and antigen rapid tests. There were 97,967 suspected cases.
  - Indonesia confirmed 7,725 new cases, bringing the total number to 1,877,050. 5,883 patients recovered, bringing the total number to 1,723,253. 170 patients deceased, bringing the tally to 52,162. 510 municipalities and regencies had reported at least one positive case.
  - As of 18:00 WIB (UTC+7), 18,865,980 people had taken the first dose of vaccine while 11,449,908 had completed the process with the second dose.
  - 232 people were tested positive for COVID-19 after attended a wedding reception in Lamongan. 14 of them died.
  - Kudus in Central Java experienced a significant spike in COVID-19 cases up to 7,594%, the highest of all cities and regencies in Indonesia after Eid al-Fitr holidays in mid-May.
- 10 June
  - 17,619,996 specimens had been tested from 11,842,433 people using RT-PCR, TCM, and antigen rapid tests. There were 102,824 suspected cases.
  - Indonesia confirmed 8,892 new cases, bringing the total number to 1,885,942. 5,661 patients recovered, bringing the total number to 1,728,914. 211 patients deceased, bringing the tally to 52,373. 510 municipalities and regencies had reported at least one positive case.
  - As of 18:00 WIB (UTC+7), 19,367,990 people had taken the first dose of vaccine while 11,495,383 had completed the process with the second dose.
  - 1,504,800 doses of the Oxford-AstraZeneca vaccine arrived in Indonesia.
- 11 June
  - 17,735,758 specimens had been tested from 11,916,618 people using RT-PCR, TCM, and antigen rapid tests. There were 106,350 suspected cases.
  - Indonesia confirmed 8,083 new cases, bringing the total number to 1,894,025. 6,230 patients recovered, bringing the total number to 1,735,144. 193 patients deceased, bringing the tally to 52,566. 510 municipalities and regencies had reported at least one positive case.
  - As of 18:00 WIB (UTC+7), 19,759,205 people had taken the first dose of vaccine while 11,524,042 had completed the process with the second dose.
  - One million doses of the Sinopharm BIBP vaccine arrived in Indonesia.
- 12 June
  - 17,833,717 specimens had been tested from 11,979,782 people using RT-PCR, TCM, and antigen rapid tests. There were 106,894 suspected cases.
  - Indonesia confirmed 7,465 new cases, bringing the total number to 1,901,490. 5,292 patients recovered, bringing the total number to 1,740,436. 164 patients deceased, bringing the tally to 52,730. 510 municipalities and regencies had reported at least one positive case.
  - As of 18:00 WIB (UTC+7), 20,078,025 people had taken the first dose of vaccine while 11,554,724 had completed the process with the second dose.
- 13 June
  - 17,904,185 specimens had been tested from 12,028,132 people using RT-PCR, TCM, and antigen rapid tests. There were 108,997 suspected cases.
  - Indonesia confirmed 9,868 new cases, bringing the total number to 1,911,358. 4,655 patients recovered, bringing the total number to 1,745,091. 149 patients deceased, bringing the tally to 52,879. 510 municipalities and regencies had reported at least one positive case.
  - As of 18:00 WIB (UTC+7), 20,079,784 people had taken the first dose of vaccine while 11,555,542 had completed the process with the second dose.
- 14 June
  - 17,973,499 specimens had been tested from 12,080,845 people using RT-PCR, TCM, and antigen rapid tests. There were 111,747 suspected cases.
  - Indonesia confirmed 8,189 new cases, bringing the total number to 1,919,547. 6,143 patients recovered, bringing the total number to 1,751,234. 237 patients deceased, bringing the tally to 53,116. 510 municipalities and regencies had reported at least one positive case.
  - As of 18:00 WIB (UTC+7), 20,586,259 people had taken the first dose of vaccine while 11,620,545 had completed the process with the second dose.
- 15 June
  - 18,082,299 specimens had been tested from 12,139,998 people using RT-PCR, TCM, and antigen rapid tests. There were 108,632 suspected cases.
  - Indonesia confirmed 8,161 new cases, bringing the total number to 1,927,708. 6,407 patients recovered, bringing the total number to 1,757,641. 164 patients deceased, bringing the tally to 53,280. 510 municipalities and regencies had reported at least one positive case.
  - As of 18:00 WIB (UTC+7), 21,130,122 people had taken the first dose of vaccine while 11,715,550 had completed the process with the second dose.
  - The national government extended the micro-scale enforcement of restrictions on community activities until 28 June 2021 in all 34 provinces across the country.
  - Surabaya in East Java expanded its vaccination program to all residents age 18 and above.
  - The Ministry of Health revealed that there were 145 variant of concern cases detected in Indonesia; 76 in Central Java, 48 in Jakarta, four in South Sumatra, three each in East Java, Central Kalimantan, East Kalimantan, two each in West Java, North Sumatra, and one each in Bali, Riau, Riau Islands, South Kalimantan.
- 16 June
  - 18,174,981 specimens had been tested from 12,182,070 people using RT-PCR, TCM, and antigen rapid tests. There were 110,660 suspected cases.
  - Indonesia confirmed 9,944 new cases, bringing the total number to 1,937,652. 6,229 patients recovered, bringing the total number to 1,763,870. 196 patients deceased, bringing the tally to 53,476.
  - As of 18:00 WIB (UTC+7), 21,619,220 people had taken the first dose of vaccine while 11,839,394 had completed the process with the second dose.
- 17 June
  - 18,305,810 specimens had been tested from 12,261,392 people using RT-PCR, TCM, and antigen rapid tests. There were 110,472 suspected cases.
  - Indonesia confirmed 12,624 new cases, bringing the total number to 1,950,276. 7,350 patients recovered, bringing the total number to 1,771,220. 277 patients deceased, bringing the tally to 53,753. 510 municipalities and regencies had reported at least one positive case.
  - As of 18:00 WIB (UTC+7), 22,144,096 people had taken the first dose of vaccine while 11,999,104 had completed the process with the second dose.
  - Bali expanded its vaccination program to all residents age 18 and above.
- 18 June
  - 18,438,025 specimens had been tested from 12,335,197 people using RT-PCR, TCM, and antigen rapid tests; in the previous 24 hours, a record-breaking 132,215 tests were conducted. There were 111,635 suspected cases.
  - Indonesia confirmed 12,990 new cases, bringing the total number to 1,963,266. 7,907 patients recovered, bringing the total number to 1,779,127. 290 patients deceased, bringing the tally to 54,043. 510 municipalities and regencies had reported at least one positive case.
  - As of 18:00 WIB (UTC+7), 22,560,568 people had taken the first dose of vaccine while 12,112,830 had completed the process with the second dose.
  - Jakarta reported 4,737 cases in the last 24 hours, the highest daily new cases by a province since West Java made the record by reporting 4,601 on 30 January 2021.
  - The daily positivity rate (excluding antigen tests) hit 45.53%, the highest ever.
- 19 June
  - 18,560,435 specimens had been tested from 12,410,802 people using RT-PCR, TCM, and antigen rapid tests. There were 118,023 suspected cases.
  - Indonesia confirmed 12,906 new cases, bringing the total number to 1,976,172. 7,016 patients recovered, bringing the total number to 1,786,143. 248 patients deceased, bringing the tally to 54,291. 510 municipalities and regencies had reported at least one positive case.
  - As of 18:00 WIB (UTC+7), 22,898,275 people had taken the first dose of vaccine while 12,202,738 had completed the process with the second dose.
  - There were 5,642 new daily active cases added across the country, the highest ever.
  - A massive 4,895 cases were reported in Jakarta, breaking the record of the highest daily new cases by a province for the second day in a row.
- 20 June
  - 18,649,618 specimens had been tested from 12,471,031 people using RT-PCR, TCM, and antigen rapid tests. There were 121,684 suspected cases.
  - Indonesia confirmed 13,737 new cases, bringing the total number to 1,989,909. 6,385 patients recovered, bringing the total number to 1,792,528. 371 patients deceased, bringing the tally to 54,662. 510 municipalities and regencies had reported at least one positive case.
  - As of 18:00 WIB (UTC+7), 22,940,700 people had taken the first dose of vaccine while 12,208,344 had completed the process with the second dose.
  - There were 6,981 new daily active cases added across the country, the highest ever.
  - For the third consecutive day, Jakarta broke the most daily cases by a province record by reporting 5,582 new cases.
  - 10 million doses of CoronaVac arrived in Indonesia.
- 21 June
  - 18,734,036 specimens had been tested from 12,533,392 people using RT-PCR, TCM, and antigen rapid tests. There were 124,845 suspected cases.
  - Indonesia confirmed a record-breaking 14,536 new cases – surpassing the record of 30 January 2021, bringing the total number to 2,004,445; it became the 18th country in the world and the first in Southeast Asia to pass two million cases. 9,233 patients recovered, bringing the total number to 1,801,761. 294 patients deceased, bringing the tally to 54,956. 510 municipalities and regencies had reported at least one positive case.
  - As of 18:00 WIB (UTC+7), 23,423,398 people had taken the first dose of vaccine while 12,363,230 had completed the process with the second dose.
  - The government tightened the micro-scale enforcement of restrictions on community activities until 5 July 2021 amidst rising COVID-19 cases.
- 22 June
  - 18,864,666 specimens had been tested from 12,604,134 people using RT-PCR, TCM, and antigen rapid tests. There were 124,918 suspected cases.
  - Indonesia confirmed 13,668 new cases, bringing the total number to 2,018,113. 8,375 patients recovered, bringing the total number to 1,810,136. 335 patients deceased, bringing the tally to 55,291. 510 municipalities and regencies had reported at least one positive case.
  - As of 18:00 WIB (UTC+7), 23,886,601 people had taken the first dose of vaccine while 12,545,626 had completed the process with the second dose.
  - The daily positivity rate (excluding antigen tests) hit 51.62%, the highest ever. This meant one out of two people tested was COVID-19 positive.
- 23 June
  - 19,005,853 specimens had been tested from 12,678,525 people using RT-PCR, TCM, and antigen rapid tests; in the previous 24 hours, a record-breaking 141,187 tests were conducted. There were 124,022 suspected cases.
  - Indonesia confirmed a record-breaking 15,308 new cases – surpassing the record on 21 June 2021, bringing the total number to 2,033,421. 7,167 patients recovered, bringing the total number to 1,817,303. 303 patients deceased, bringing the tally to 55,594. 510 municipalities and regencies had reported at least one positive case.
  - As of 18:00 WIB (UTC+7), 24,547,308 people had taken the first dose of vaccine while 12,632,708 had completed the process with the second dose.
  - There were 7,167 new daily active cases added across the country, the highest ever.
- 24 June
  - 19,142,749 specimens had been tested from 12,769,028 people using RT-PCR, TCM, and antigen rapid tests. There were 126,696 suspected cases.
  - Indonesia confirmed a record-breaking 20,574 new cases – surpassing the record on the previous day, bringing the total number to 2,053,995. 9,201 patients recovered, bringing the total number to 1,826,504. 355 patients deceased, bringing the tally to 55,949. 510 municipalities and regencies had reported at least one positive case.
  - As of 18:00 WIB (UTC+7), 25,115,340 people had taken the first dose of vaccine while 12,796,459 had completed the process with the second dose.
  - There were 11,018 new daily active cases added across the country, the highest ever.
  - Jakarta broke its own record on 20 June 2021 by reporting 7,505 cases in the last 24 hours, the highest daily new cases by a province.
- 25 June
  - 19,283,664 specimens had been tested from 12,864,479 people using RT-PCR, TCM, and antigen rapid tests. There were 127,422 suspected cases.
  - Indonesia confirmed 18,872 new cases, bringing the total number to 2,072,867. 8,557 patients recovered, bringing the total number to 1,835,061. 422 patients deceased, bringing the tally to 56,371. 510 municipalities and regencies had reported at least one positive case.
  - As of 18:00 WIB (UTC+7), 25,900,893 people had taken the first dose of vaccine while 12,970,603 had completed the process with the second dose.
  - There were 181,435 active cases per this day, the highest ever.
  - Jakarta became the first province to pass 500,000 cases.
  - The Ministry of Health decided to fasten the vaccination program by permitting everyone being vaccinated at their operating hospitals and polytechnics regardless of the domicile.
  - Hong Kong banned all flights from and to Indonesia due to the COVID-19 cases spike.
- 26 June
  - 19,419,298 specimens had been tested from 12,962,753 people using RT-PCR, TCM, and antigen rapid tests. There were 129,071 suspected cases.
  - Indonesia confirmed a record-breaking 21,095 new cases – surpassing the record on 24 June 2021, bringing the total number to 2,093,962. 7,396 patients recovered, bringing the total number to 1,842,457. 358 patients deceased, bringing the tally to 56,729. 510 municipalities and regencies had reported at least one positive case.
  - As of 18:00 WIB (UTC+7), 26,192,256 people had taken the first dose of vaccine while 13,020,134 had completed the process with the second dose.
  - There were 13,341 new daily active cases added across the country, the highest ever.
  - There were 194,776 active cases per this day, the highest ever.
  - Jakarta broke its own record on 24 June 2021 by reporting 9,271 cases in the last 24 hours, the highest daily new cases by a province. It had 51,803 active cases per this day, also the highest by a province.
- 27 June
  - 19,518,202 specimens had been tested from 13,042,286 people using RT-PCR, TCM, and antigen rapid tests. There were 129,891 suspected cases.
  - Indonesia confirmed a record-breaking 21,342 new cases – surpassing the record on the previous day, bringing the total number to 2,115,304. 8,024 patients recovered, bringing the total number to 1,850,481. 409 patients deceased, bringing the tally to 57,138. 510 municipalities and regencies had reported at least one positive case.
  - As of 18:00 WIB (UTC+7), 27,061,850 people had taken the first dose of vaccine while 13,063,004 had completed the process with the second dose.
  - There were 207,685 active cases per this day, the highest ever. It was also the first time that the number of active cases crossed 200,000 mark.
  - Jakarta broke its own record on the previous day by reporting 9,394 cases in the last 24 hours, the highest daily new cases by a province. It had 57,640 active cases per this day, also the highest from any province.
  - The National Agency of Drug and Food Control (BPOM) published an emergency use authorization for CoronaVac for ages 12 to 17.
- 28 June
  - 19,616,389 specimens had been tested from 13,122,594 people using RT-PCR, TCM, and antigen rapid tests. There were 133,130 suspected cases.
  - Indonesia confirmed 20,694 new cases, bringing the total number to 2,135,998. 9,480 patients recovered, bringing the total number to 1,859,961. 423 patients deceased, bringing the tally to 57,561. 510 municipalities and regencies had reported at least one positive case.
  - As of 18:00 WIB (UTC+7), 27,648,794 people had taken the first dose of vaccine while 13,203,708 had completed the process with the second dose.
  - There were 218,476 active cases per this day, the highest ever. Jakarta alone had 62,494, the highest by a province.
- 29 June
  - 19,760,346 specimens had been tested from 13,225,859 people using RT-PCR, TCM, and antigen rapid tests; in the previous 24 hours, a record-breaking 143,957 tests were conducted. There were 132,723 suspected cases.
  - Indonesia confirmed 20,467 new cases, bringing the total number to 2,156,465. 9,645 patients recovered, bringing the total number to 1,869,606. 463 patients deceased, bringing the tally to 58,024. 510 municipalities and regencies had reported at least one positive case.
  - As of 18:00 WIB (UTC+7), 28,523,117 people had taken the first dose of vaccine while 13,312,671 had completed the process with the second dose.
  - There were 228,835 active cases per this day, the highest ever. Jakarta alone had 66,288, the highest by a province.
- 30 June
  - 19,903,077 specimens had been tested from 13,326,172 people using RT-PCR, TCM, and antigen rapid tests. There were 130,443 suspected cases.
  - Indonesia confirmed a record-breaking 21,807 new cases – surpassing the record on 27 June 2021, bringing the total number to 2,178,272. 10,807 patients recovered, bringing the total number to 1,880,413. 467 patients deceased, bringing the tally to 58,491. 510 municipalities and regencies had reported at least one positive case.
  - As of 18:00 WIB (UTC+7), 29,402,862 people had taken the first dose of vaccine while 13,469,806 had completed the process with the second dose. This marked the daily number of people vaccinated crossed one million for the first time.
  - There were 239,368 active cases per this day, the highest ever. Jakarta alone had 70,375, the highest by a province.
  - 14 million doses of CoronaVac arrived in Indonesia.

== July ==
- 1 July
  - 20,058,268 specimens had been tested from 13,424,744 people using RT-PCR, TCM, and antigen rapid tests; in the previous 24 hours, a record-breaking 155,191 tests were conducted. There were 131,329 suspected cases.
  - Indonesia confirmed a record-breaking 24,836 new cases – surpassing the record on the previous day, bringing the total number to 2,203,108. 9,874 patients recovered, bringing the total number to 1,890,287. A record-smashing 504 patients deceased – the most since the previous record from 28 January 2021, bringing the tally to 58,995. 510 municipalities and regencies had reported at least one positive case.
  - There were 14,458 new daily active cases added across the country, the highest ever.
  - As of 18:00 WIB (UTC+7), 30,483,730 people had taken the first dose of vaccine while 13,677,230 had completed the process with the second dose.
  - There were 253,826 active cases per this day, the highest ever. Jakarta alone had 74,343, the highest by a province.
  - Coordinating Minister for Maritime and Investments Affairs Luhut Binsar Pandjaitan announced that the emergency micro-scale enforcement of restrictions on community activities would be applied to 122 cities and regencies in Bali and Java with level-4 (48) and level-3 (74) assessment rate.
  - 998,400 doses of the Oxford–AstraZeneca vaccine from Japan arrived in Indonesia.
- 2 July
  - 20,211,876 specimens had been tested from 13,527,509 people using RT-PCR, TCM, and antigen rapid tests. There were 135,043 suspected cases.
  - Indonesia confirmed a record-breaking 25,830 new cases – surpassing the record for the third successive day, bringing the total number to 2,228,938. 11,578 patients recovered, bringing the total number to 1,901,865. 504 patients deceased – breaking the most daily deaths record for the second day in a row, bringing the tally to 59,534. 510 municipalities and regencies had reported at least one positive case.
  - There were 267,539 active cases per this day, the highest ever. Jakarta alone had 78,699, the highest by a province.
  - As of 18:00 WIB (UTC+7), 31,090,765 people had taken the first dose of vaccine while 13,830,517 had completed the process with the second dose.
  - Jakarta broke its own record on 27 June 2021 by reporting 9,399 cases in the last 24 hours, the highest daily new cases by a province.
  - The National Agency of Drug and Food Control (BPOM) published an emergency use authorization for the Moderna vaccine.
- 3 July
  - 20,369,103 specimens had been tested from 13,638,492 people using RT-PCR, TCM, and antigen rapid tests; in the previous 24 hours, a record-breaking 157,227 tests were conducted to 110,983 people – another record-breaker. There were 133,189 suspected cases.
  - Indonesia confirmed a record-breaking 27,913 new cases – surpassing the record for the fourth successive day, bringing the total number to 2,256,851. A record-smashing 13,282 patients recovered – breaking the most daily recoveries record set on 8 February 2021, bringing the total number to 1,915,147. 493 patients deceased, bringing the tally to 60,027. 510 municipalities and regencies had reported at least one positive case.
  - As of 18:00 WIB (UTC+7), 31,961,064 people had taken the first dose of vaccine while 13,970,538 had completed the process with the second dose.
  - There were 281,677 active cases per this day, the highest ever. Jakarta alone had 82,679, the highest by a province.
  - Jakarta broke its own record on the previous day by reporting 9,702 cases in the last 24 hours, the highest daily new cases by a province.
- 4 July
  - 20,489,937 specimens had been tested from 13,724,784 people using RT-PCR, TCM, and antigen rapid tests. There were 135,120 suspected cases.
  - Indonesia confirmed 27,233 new cases, bringing the total number to 2,284,084. 13,127 patients recovered, bringing the total number to 1,928,274. A record-smashing 555 patients deceased – breaking the most daily deaths record set on 2 July 2021, bringing the tally to 60,582. 510 municipalities and regencies had reported at least one positive case.
  - There were 295,228 active cases per this day, the highest ever. Jakarta alone had 87,272, the highest by a province.
  - As of 18:00 WIB (UTC+7), 32,063,745 people had taken the first dose of vaccine while 13,979,564 had completed the process with the second dose.
  - Jakarta broke its own record on the previous day by reporting 10,485 cases in the last 24 hours, the highest daily new cases by a province.
- 5 July
  - 20,600,052 specimens had been tested from 13,817,182 people using RT-PCR, TCM, and antigen rapid tests. There were 79,808 suspected cases.
  - Indonesia confirmed a record-breaking 29,745 new cases – surpassing the record set on 3 July 2021, bringing the total number to 2,313,829. Another record was smashed with 14,416 patients recovered – breaking the most daily recoveries record set on 3 July 2021, bringing the total number to 1,942,690. The death number was also a record as 558 patients deceased – breaking the most daily deaths record set on the previous day, bringing the tally to 61,140. 510 municipalities and regencies had reported at least one positive case.
  - There were 309,999 active cases per this day, the highest ever. It was also the first time that the number of active cases crossed 300,000 mark.
  - There were 14,771 new daily active cases added across the country, the highest ever. With this, all the four main indicators (deaths, recoveries, confirmed, and active cases) broke records simultaneously.
  - As of 18:00 WIB (UTC+7), 32,460,653 people had taken the first dose of vaccine while 14,095,900 had completed the process with the second dose.
  - For the first time ever, Indonesia had the second highest daily new cases in the world, just behind India.
  - Jakarta broke its own record on the previous day by reporting 10,903 cases in the last 24 hours, the highest daily new cases by a province. It had 91,458 active cases per this day, also the highest by a province.
  - The government renewed the travelling terms and requirements during the emergency community activities restrictions enforcement. Travellers who wanted to visit Indonesia would have to perform a PCR test at least 72 hours before their departure and show their vaccination certificate. They would be tested again when they arrive in Indonesia, followed mandatory quarantine for eight days, and for those who wanted to travel domestically would have to be vaccinated with the Gotong Royong vaccine.
- 6 July
  - 20,783,105 specimens had been tested from 13,953,947 people using RT-PCR, TCM, and antigen rapid tests; in the previous 24 hours, a record-breaking 183,053 tests were conducted to 136,765 people – another record-breaker. There were 86,969 suspected cases.
  - Indonesia confirmed a record-breaking 31,189 new cases – surpassing the record set on the previous day, bringing the total number to 2,345,018. Another record set on the previous day was smashed with 15,863 patients recovered, bringing the total number to 1,958,553. The death number was also a record as 728 patients deceased – also breaking the most daily deaths record set on the previous day, bringing the tally to 61,868. 510 municipalities and regencies had reported at least one positive case.
  - There were 324,597 active cases per this day, the highest ever. Jakarta alone had 94,660, the highest by a province.
  - As of 18:00 WIB (UTC+7), 33,488,253 people had taken the first dose of vaccine while 14,357,113 had completed the process with the second dose.
  - West Nusa Tenggara became the last province to pass 250 cases per 100,000 people.
  - The Ministry of Health changed the zoning criteria from the number of confirmed cases into tests performed per 1,000 population and positivity rate.
  - The government tightened the community activities restrictions enforcement in 43 regencies and cities outside Java and Bali.
- 7 July
  - 20,982,248 specimens had been tested from 14,095,904 people using RT-PCR, TCM, and antigen rapid tests; in the previous 24 hours, a record-breaking 199,143 tests were conducted to 141,957 people – another record-breaker. There were 93,407 suspected cases.
  - Indonesia confirmed a record-breaking 34,379 new cases – surpassing the record for the third successive day, bringing the total number to 2,379,397. 14,835 patients recovered, bringing the total number to 1,973,388. The death number was also a record as 1,040 patients deceased – also breaking the most daily deaths record for the third day in a row, bringing the tally to 62,908. 510 municipalities and regencies had reported at least one positive case.
  - There were 343,101 active cases per this day, the highest ever. Jakarta alone had 100,229, the highest by a province. It also became the first province to ever hit 100,000 active cases.
  - There were 18,504 new daily active cases added across the country, the highest ever.
  - As of 18:00 WIB (UTC+7), 34,249,444 people had taken the first dose of vaccine while 14,516,938 had completed the process with the second dose.
  - For the first time ever, Indonesia had the number of daily deaths exceeding 1,000 and ranked second in the category worldwide.
  - Central Java broke Banten's record set on 4 April 2021 for most deaths in 24 hours as 480 people succumbed to the disease.
- 8 July
  - 21,182,629 specimens had been tested from 14,231,840 people using RT-PCR, TCM, and antigen rapid tests; in the previous 24 hours, a record-breaking 200,381 tests were conducted. There were 100,839 suspected cases.
  - Indonesia confirmed a record-breaking 38,391 new cases – surpassing the record for the fourth successive day, bringing the total number to 2,417,788. 21,185 patients recovered – smashing the most daily recoveries record from 6 July 2021, bringing the total number to 1,994,573. 852 patients deceased, bringing the tally to 63,760. 510 municipalities and regencies had reported at least one positive case.
  - There were 359,455 active cases per this day, the highest ever.
  - As of 18:00 WIB (UTC+7), 34,959,051 people had taken the first dose of vaccine while 14,659,369 had completed the process with the second dose.
  - Jakarta broke its own record set three days prior by reporting 12,974 cases in the last 24 hours, the highest daily new cases by a province. It also had 102,216 active cases, the highest by a province. However, the capital also reported 10,857 recoveries in 24 hours, breaking the record for most recoveries per day set by West Java on 3 June 2021.
- 9 July
  - 21,402,544 specimens had been tested from 14,373,845 people using RT-PCR, TCM, and antigen rapid tests; in the previous 24 hours, a record-breaking 219,915 tests were conducted to 142,005 people – another record-breaker. There were 118,701 suspected cases.
  - Indonesia confirmed 38,124 new cases, bringing the total number to 2,455,912. 28,975 patients recovered – smashing the most daily recoveries record set on the previous day, bringing the total number to 2,023,548. 871 patients deceased, bringing the tally to 64,631. 510 municipalities and regencies had reported at least one positive case.
  - There were 367,733 active cases per this day, the highest ever.
  - As of 18:00 WIB (UTC+7), 36,059,414 people had taken the first dose of vaccine while 14,949,729 had completed the process with the second dose.
  - Jakarta broke its own record set on the previous day by reporting 13,112 cases in the last 24 hours, the highest daily new cases by a province. However, the capital also reported 15,022 recoveries in 24 hours, smashing the record for most recoveries per day set by itself on the previous day as well.
- 10 July
  - 21,597,103 specimens had been tested from 14,519,139 people using RT-PCR, TCM, and antigen rapid tests; in the previous 24 hours, tests were conducted to a record-breaking 145,294 people. There were 135,378 suspected cases.
  - Indonesia confirmed 35,094 new cases, bringing the total number to 2,491,006. 28,561 patients recovered, bringing the total number to 2,052,109. 826 patients deceased, bringing the tally to 65,457. 510 municipalities and regencies had reported at least one positive case.
  - There were 373,440 active cases per this day, the highest ever.
  - As of 18:00 WIB (UTC+7), 36,217,975 people had taken the first dose of vaccine while 14,983,549 had completed the process with the second dose.
  - Jakarta reported 16,839 recoveries in the last 24 hours, the highest by a province.
  - Singapore tightened restrictions for Indonesians to enter its territories, while United Arab Emirates and Oman denied their entry, all due to the COVID-19 cases surge in Indonesia.
- 11 July
  - 21,756,322 specimens had been tested from 14,647,194 people using RT-PCR, TCM, and antigen rapid tests. There were 152,151 suspected cases.
  - Indonesia confirmed 36,197 new cases, bringing the total number to 2,527,203. 32,615 patients recovered – smashing the most daily recoveries record set on 9 July 2021, bringing the total number to 2,084,724. 1,007 patients deceased, bringing the tally to 66,464. 510 municipalities and regencies had reported at least one positive case.
  - There were 376,015 active cases per this day, the highest ever.
  - As of 18:00 WIB (UTC+7), 36,278,606 people had taken the first dose of vaccine while 15,016,402 had completed the process with the second dose.
  - Jakarta reported 20,602 recoveries in the last 24 hours, the highest by a province.
  - For the first time ever, Indonesia had the highest daily new deaths in the world, ahead of India.
  - Three million doses of the Moderna vaccine from the United States arrived in Indonesia.
- 12 July
  - 21,906,066 specimens had been tested from 14,770,511 people using RT-PCR, TCM, and antigen rapid tests. There were 170,101 suspected cases.
  - Indonesia confirmed a record-breaking 40,427 new cases – surpassing the record set on 8 July 2021, bringing the total number to 2,417,788. 34,754 patients recovered – smashing the most daily recoveries record set on the previous day, bringing the total number to 2,119,478. 891 patients deceased, bringing the tally to 67,355. 510 municipalities and regencies had reported at least one positive case.
  - There were 380,797 active cases per this day, the highest ever.
  - As of 18:00 WIB (UTC+7), 36,395,019 people had taken the first dose of vaccine while 15,038,548 had completed the process with the second dose.
  - Jakarta broke its own record set on 9 July 2021 by reporting 14,619 cases in the last 24 hours, the highest daily new cases by a province.
  - For the first time ever, Indonesia had the highest daily new cases in the world, ahead of the United Kingdom.
  - The government applied emergency community activities restrictions enforcement in further 15 regencies and cities, all of which were outside Java and Bali.
  - 10 million doses of CoronaVac arrived in Indonesia.
- 13 July
  - 22,133,149 specimens had been tested from 14,929,865 people using RT-PCR, TCM, and antigen rapid tests; in the previous 24 hours, a record-breaking 227,083 tests were conducted to 159,354 people – another record-breaker. There were 181,043 suspected cases.
  - Indonesia confirmed a record-breaking 47,899 new cases – surpassing the record set on the previous day, bringing the total number to 2,615,529. 20,123 patients recovered, bringing the total number to 2,139,601. 864 patients deceased, bringing the tally to 68,219. 510 municipalities and regencies had reported at least one positive case.
  - There were 407,709 active cases per this day, the highest ever. It was also the first time that the number of active cases crossed 400,000 mark.
  - There were 26,912 new daily active cases added across the country, surpassing the highest ever record set on 7 July 2021.
  - As of 18:00 WIB (UTC+7), 37,031,826 people had taken the first dose of vaccine while 15,254,221 had completed the process with the second dose.
  - 1,408,000 doses of the Sinopharm BIBP vaccine and 3,476,400 doses of the Oxford–AstraZeneca vaccine arrived in Indonesia.
  - Bahrain and the Philippines banned Indonesians from entering their territories due to the COVID-19 cases spike.
- 14 July
  - 22,373,873 specimens had been tested from 15,102,724 people using RT-PCR, TCM, and antigen rapid tests; in the previous 24 hours, a record-breaking 240,724 tests were conducted to 172,859 people – another record-breaker. There were 192,716 suspected cases.
  - Indonesia confirmed a record-breaking 54,517 new cases – surpassing the record for the third consecutive day, bringing the total number to 2,670,046. 17,762 patients recovered, bringing the total number to 2,157,363. 991 patients deceased, bringing the tally to 69,210. 510 municipalities and regencies had reported at least one positive case.
  - There were 443,473 active cases per this day, the highest ever.
  - There were 35,764 new daily active cases added across the country, surpassing the highest ever record set on the previous day.
  - As of 18:00 WIB (UTC+7), 39,278,153 people had taken the first dose of vaccine while 15,685,534 had completed the process with the second dose. This marked the daily number of people vaccinated crossed two million for the first time.
  - Indonesia passed 1,000 cases per 100,000 population. This meant 1% of Indonesian population had contracted COVID-19.
- 15 July
  - 22,622,932 specimens had been tested from 15,288,045 people using RT-PCR, TCM, and antigen rapid tests; in the previous 24 hours, a record-breaking 249,059 tests were conducted to 185,321 people – another record-breaker. There were 209,186 suspected cases.
  - Indonesia confirmed a record-breaking 56,757 new cases – surpassing the record for the fourth consecutive day, bringing the total number to 2,726,803. 19,049 patients recovered, bringing the total number to 2,176,412. 982 patients deceased, bringing the tally to 70,192. 510 municipalities and regencies had reported at least one positive case.
  - There were 480,199 active cases per this day, the highest ever.
  - There were 36,726 new daily active cases added across the country, surpassing the highest ever record set on the previous day.
  - As of 18:00 WIB (UTC+7), 39,943,004 people had taken the first dose of vaccine while 15,876,777 had completed the process with the second dose.
  - The National Agency of Drug and Food Control of Indonesia (BPOM) published an emergency use authorization for the Pfizer–BioNTech vaccine.
  - 1.5 million doses of the Moderna vaccine and 1.16 million doses of the Oxford-AstraZeneca vaccine arrived in Indonesia.
- 16 July
  - 22,881,464 specimens had been tested from 15,467,261 people using RT-PCR, TCM, and antigen rapid tests; in the previous 24 hours, a record-breaking 258,532 tests were conducted. There were 226,551 suspected cases.
  - Indonesia confirmed 54,000 new cases, bringing the total number to 2,780,803. 28,079 patients recovered, bringing the total number to 2,204,491. 1,205 patients deceased – breaking the most daily deaths record set on 7 July 2021, bringing the tally to 71,397. 510 municipalities and regencies had reported at least one positive case.
  - There were 504,915 active cases per this day, the highest ever. It was also the first time that the number of active cases crossed 500,000 mark.
  - As of 18:00 WIB (UTC+7), 40,912,440 people had taken the first dose of vaccine while 16,098,999 had completed the process with the second dose.
  - 1.4 million doses of the Sinopharm BIBP vaccine and 1.04 million doses of the Oxford–AstraZeneca vaccine arrived in Indonesia.
  - The third inoculation for healthcare workers program using the Moderna vaccine was started at Dr. Cipto Mangunkusumo Hospital.
  - The government announced that paid Gotong Royong vaccination program by Kimia Farma was cancelled after they received criticism from people who demanded it to be free.
- 17 July
  - 23,132,856 specimens had been tested from 15,655,812 people using RT-PCR, TCM, and antigen rapid tests; in the previous 24 hours, tests were conducted to a record-breaking 188,551 people. There were 239,294 suspected cases.
  - Indonesia confirmed 51,952 new cases, bringing the total number to 2,832,755. 27,903 patients recovered, bringing the total number to 2,232,394. 1,092 patients deceased, bringing the tally to 72,489. 510 municipalities and regencies had reported at least one positive case.
  - There were 527,872 active cases per this day, the highest ever.
  - As of 18:00 WIB (UTC+7), 41,268,627 people had taken the first dose of vaccine while 16,217,855 had completed the process with the second dose.
- 18 July
  - 23,325,774 specimens had been tested from 15,793,858 people using RT-PCR, TCM, and antigen rapid tests. There were 253,785 suspected cases.
  - Indonesia confirmed 44,721 new cases, bringing the total number to 2,877,476. 29,264 patients recovered, bringing the total number to 2,261,658. 1,093 patients deceased, bringing the tally to 73,582. 510 municipalities and regencies had reported at least one positive case.
  - There were 542,236 active cases per this day, the highest ever.
  - As of 18:00 WIB (UTC+7), 41,778,063 people had taken the first dose of vaccine while 16,283,343 had completed the process with the second dose.
- 19 July
  - 23,486,979 specimens had been tested from 15,921,448 people using RT-PCR, TCM, and antigen rapid tests. There were 269,455 suspected cases.
  - Indonesia confirmed 34,257 new cases, bringing the total number to 2,911,733. 32,217 patients recovered, bringing the total number to 2,293,875. 1,338 patients deceased – breaking the most daily deaths record set on 16 July 2021, bringing the tally to 74,920. 510 municipalities and regencies had reported at least one positive case.
  - There were 542,938 active cases per this day, the highest ever.
  - As of 18:00 WIB (UTC+7), 42,313,731 people had taken the first dose of vaccine while 16,444,462 had completed the process with the second dose.
  - 1,184,000 doses of the Sinopharm BIBP vaccine arrived in Indonesia.
- 20 July
  - 23,666,254 specimens had been tested from 16,036,122 people using RT-PCR, TCM, and antigen rapid tests. There were 267,333 suspected cases.
  - Indonesia confirmed 38,325 new cases, bringing the total number to 2,950,058. 29,791 patients recovered, bringing the total number to 2,323,666. 1,280 patients deceased, bringing the tally to 76,200. 510 municipalities and regencies had reported at least one positive case.
  - There were 550,192 active cases per this day, the highest ever.
  - As of 18:00 WIB (UTC+7), 42,360,779 people had taken the first dose of vaccine while 16,453,805 had completed the process with the second dose.
  - The government extended the emergency community activities restrictions enforcement until 25 July.
- 21 July
  - 23,819,584 specimens had been tested from 16,152,354 people using RT-PCR, TCM, and antigen rapid tests. There were 271,662 suspected cases.
  - Indonesia confirmed 33,772 new cases, bringing the total number to 2,983,830. 32,887 patients recovered, bringing the total number to 2,356,553. 1,383 patients deceased – breaking the most daily deaths record set on 19 July 2021, bringing the tally to 77,583. 510 municipalities and regencies had reported at least one positive case.
  - As of 18:00 WIB (UTC+7), 42,868,023 people had taken the first dose of vaccine while 16,713,406 had completed the process with the second dose.
  - There were decrease of active cases for the first time since 2 June 2021 with 549,694 cases remaining.
- 22 July
  - 24,114,054 specimens had been tested from 16,381,056 people using RT-PCR, TCM, and antigen rapid tests; in the previous 24 hours, a record-breaking 294,470 tests were conducted to 228,702 people – another record-breaker. There were 271,167 suspected cases.
  - Indonesia confirmed 49,509 new cases, bringing the total number to 3,033,339; it became the 14th country in the world and the first in Southeast Asia to pass three million cases. 36,370 patients recovered – smashing the most daily recoveries record set on 12 July 2021, bringing the total number to 2,392,923. 1,383 patients deceased – breaking the most daily deaths record set on the previous day, bringing the tally to 79,032. 510 municipalities and regencies had reported at least one positive case.
  - There were 561,384 active cases per this day, the highest ever.
  - As of 18:00 WIB (UTC+7), 43,471,431 people had taken the first dose of vaccine while 17,012,830 had completed the process with the second dose.
  - Eight million doses of CoronaVac arrived in Indonesia.
  - Indonesia banned foreign workers from entering its territories during the community activities restrictions enforcement.
- 23 July
  - 24,388,300 specimens had been tested from 16,583,441 people using RT-PCR, TCM, and antigen rapid tests. There were 267,866 suspected cases.
  - Indonesia confirmed 49,071 new cases, bringing the total number to 3,082,410. 38,988 patients recovered – smashing the most daily recoveries record set on the previous day, bringing the total number to 2,431,911. 1,566 patients deceased – breaking the most daily deaths record for the third successive day, bringing the tally to 80,598. 510 municipalities and regencies had reported at least one positive case.
  - There were 569,901 active cases per this day, the highest ever.
  - As of 18:00 WIB (UTC+7), 43,932,287 people had taken the first dose of vaccine while 17,253,709 had completed the process with the second dose.
- 24 July
  - 24,640,996 specimens had been tested from 16,763,394 people using RT-PCR, TCM, and antigen rapid tests. There were 264,578 suspected cases.
  - Indonesia confirmed 45,416 new cases, bringing the total number to 3,127,826. 39,767 patients recovered – smashing the most daily recoveries record set for the third successive day, bringing the total number to 2,471,678. 1,415 patients deceased, bringing the tally to 82,013. 510 municipalities and regencies had reported at least one positive case.
  - There were 574,135 active cases per this day, the highest ever.
  - As of 18:00 WIB (UTC+7), 44,342,198 people had taken the first dose of vaccine while 17,798,139 had completed the process with the second dose.
- 25 July
  - 24,814,468 specimens had been tested from 16,887,533 people using RT-PCR, TCM, and antigen rapid tests. There were 275,145 suspected cases.
  - Indonesia confirmed 38,679 new cases, bringing the total number to 3,166,505. 37,640 patients recovered, bringing the total number to 2,509,318. 1,266 patients deceased, bringing the tally to 83,279. 510 municipalities and regencies had reported at least one positive case.
  - As of 18:00 WIB (UTC+7), 44,551,337 people had taken the first dose of vaccine while 17,933,565 had completed the process with the second dose.
  - The government extended the emergency or level four community activities restrictions enforcement in Java and Bali until 2 August.
- 26 July
  - 24,975,057 specimens had been tested from 17,008,799 people using RT-PCR, TCM, and antigen rapid tests. There were 287,987 suspected cases.
  - Indonesia confirmed 28,228 new cases, bringing the total number to 3,194,733. 40,374 patients recovered – smashing the most daily recoveries record set on 22 July 2021, bringing the total number to 2,549,692. 1,487 patients deceased, bringing the tally to 84,766. 510 municipalities and regencies had reported at least one positive case.
  - There was a decrease of 13,633 active cases, the most ever.
  - As of 18:00 WIB (UTC+7), 45,012,649 people had taken the first dose of vaccine while 18,367,098 had completed the process with the second dose.
- 27 July
  - 25,245,491 specimens had been tested from 17,189,001 people using RT-PCR, TCM, and antigen rapid tests. There were 281,492 suspected cases.
  - Indonesia confirmed 45,203 new cases, bringing the total number to 3,239,936. 47,128 patients recovered – smashing the most daily recoveries record set on the previous day, bringing the total number to 2,596,820. 2,069 patients deceased – breaking the most daily deaths record set on 23 July 2021, bringing the tally to 86,835. 510 municipalities and regencies had reported at least one positive case.
  - As of 18:00 WIB (UTC+7), 45,534,183 people had taken the first dose of vaccine while 18,857,251 had completed the process with the second dose.
  - 21.2 million doses of CoronaVac arrived in Indonesia.
- 28 July
  - 25,523,300 specimens had been tested from 17,374,182 people using RT-PCR, TCM, and antigen rapid tests. There were 271,132 suspected cases.
  - Indonesia confirmed 47,791 new cases, bringing the total number to 3,287,727. 43,856 patients recovered, bringing the total number to 2,640,676. 1,824 patients deceased, bringing the tally to 88,659. 510 municipalities and regencies had reported at least one positive case.
  - As of 18:00 WIB (UTC+7), 46,053,004 people had taken the first dose of vaccine while 19,354,329 had completed the process with the second dose.
- 29 July
  - 25,786,254 specimens had been tested from 17,547,646 people using RT-PCR, TCM, and antigen rapid tests. There were 274,157 suspected cases.
  - Indonesia confirmed 43,479 new cases, bringing the total number to 3,331,206. 45,494 patients recovered, bringing the total number to 2,686,170. 1,893 patients deceased, bringing the tally to 90,552. 510 municipalities and regencies had reported at least one positive case.
  - As of 18:00 WIB (UTC+7), 46,567,370 people had taken the first dose of vaccine while 19,867,271 had completed the process with the second dose.
  - Central Java broke its own record set on 7 July 2021 for most deaths in 24 hours as 679 people succumbed to the disease.
- 30 July
  - 26,038,438 specimens had been tested from 17,712,645 people using RT-PCR, TCM, and antigen rapid tests. There were 278,546 suspected cases.
  - Indonesia confirmed 41,168 new cases, bringing the total number to 3,372,374. 44,550 patients recovered, bringing the total number to 2,730,720. 1,759 patients deceased, bringing the tally to 92,311. 510 municipalities and regencies had reported at least one positive case.
  - As of 18:00 WIB (UTC+7), 47,014,920 people had taken the first dose of vaccine while 20,302,847 had completed the process with the second dose.
  - 1.5 million doses of the Sinopharm BIBP vaccine arrived in Indonesia.
- 31 July
  - 26,280,199 specimens had been tested from 17,862,867 people using RT-PCR, TCM, and antigen rapid tests. There were 278,618 suspected cases.
  - Indonesia confirmed 37,294 new cases, bringing the total number to 3,409,658. 39,372 patients recovered, bringing the total number to 2,770,092. 1,808 patients deceased, bringing the tally to 94,119. 510 municipalities and regencies had reported at least one positive case.
  - As of 18:00 WIB (UTC+7), 47,390,494 people had taken the first dose of vaccine while 20,621,294 had completed the process with the second dose.
  - The daily positivity rate (excluding antigen tests) hit 52.15%, the highest ever.

== August ==
- 1 August
  - 26,458,578 specimens had been tested from 17,975,528 people using RT-PCR, TCM, and antigen rapid tests. There were 280,518 suspected cases.
  - Indonesia confirmed 30,738 new cases, bringing the total number to 3,440,396. 39,446 patients recovered, bringing the total number to 2,809,538. 1,604 patients deceased, bringing the tally to 95,723. 510 municipalities and regencies had reported at least one positive case.
  - As of 18:00 WIB (UTC+7), 47,562,344 people had taken the first dose of vaccine while 20,707,102 had completed the process with the second dose.
  - The daily positivity rate (excluding antigen tests) hit 52.78%, the highest ever.
  - 3.5 million doses of the Moderna vaccine from the United States arrived in Indonesia.
- 2 August
  - 26,609,794 specimens had been tested from 18,082,313 people using RT-PCR, TCM, and antigen rapid tests. There were 109,374 suspected cases.
  - Indonesia confirmed 22,404 new cases, bringing the total number to 3,462,800. 32,807 patients recovered, bringing the total number to 2,842,345. 1,568 patients deceased, bringing the tally to 97,291. 510 municipalities and regencies had reported at least one positive case.
  - As of 18:00 WIB (UTC+7), 47,847,179 people had taken the first dose of vaccine while 21,071,096 had completed the process with the second dose.
  - 620,000 doses of the Oxford–AstraZeneca vaccine arrived in Indonesia.
  - The government extended the level four community activities restrictions enforcement in several regencies and cities until 9 August.
- 3 August
  - 26,858,020 specimens had been tested from 18,234,025 people using RT-PCR, TCM, and antigen rapid tests. There were 130,628 suspected cases.
  - Indonesia confirmed 33,900 new cases, bringing the total number to 3,496,700. 32,807 patients recovered, bringing the total number to 2,873,669. 1,598 patients deceased, bringing the tally to 98,889. 510 municipalities and regencies had reported at least one positive case.
  - As of 18:00 WIB (UTC+7), 48,148,817 people had taken the first dose of vaccine while 21,496,995 had completed the process with the second dose.
  - 500,000 doses of the Sinopharm BIBP vaccine arrived in Indonesia.
- 4 August
  - 27,100,348 specimens had been tested from 18,382,837 people using RT-PCR, TCM, and antigen rapid tests. There were 146,820 suspected cases.
  - Indonesia confirmed 35,867 new cases, bringing the total number to 3,532,567. 34,251 patients recovered, bringing the total number to 2,907,920. 1,747 patients deceased, bringing the tally to 100,636; it became the 12th country in the world and the first in Southeast Asia to pass 100,000 deaths. 510 municipalities and regencies had reported at least one positive case.
  - As of 18:00 WIB (UTC+7), 48,494,768 people had taken the first dose of vaccine while 21,976,626 had completed the process with the second dose.
- 5 August
  - 27,348,904 specimens had been tested from 18,536,754 people using RT-PCR, TCM, and antigen rapid tests. There were 172,063 suspected cases.
  - Indonesia confirmed 35,764 new cases, bringing the total number to 3,568,331. 39,726 patients recovered, bringing the total number to 2,947,646. 1,739 patients deceased, bringing the tally to 102,375. 510 municipalities and regencies had reported at least one positive case.
  - As of 18:00 WIB (UTC+7), 48,856,419 people had taken the first dose of vaccine while 22,283,984 had completed the process with the second dose.
  - For the first time ever, Jakarta was not in the top ten provinces with the most active cases and the number of daily new cases outside Java (18,042) was higher than that in Java (17,722).
- 6 August
  - 27,586,460 specimens had been tested from 18,685,734 people using RT-PCR, TCM, and antigen rapid tests. There were 196,829 suspected cases.
  - Indonesia confirmed 39,532 new cases, bringing the total number to 3,607,863. 48,832 patients recovered – smashing the most daily recoveries record set on 26 July 2021, bringing the total number to 2,996,478. 1,635 patients deceased, bringing the tally to 104,010. 510 municipalities and regencies had reported at least one positive case.
  - As of 18:00 WIB (UTC+7), 49,542,688 people had taken the first dose of vaccine while 23,082,021 had completed the process with the second dose.
  - 594,200 doses of the Oxford-AstraZeneca vaccine arrived in Indonesia.
- 7 August
  - 27,822,427 specimens had been tested from 18,829,789 people using RT-PCR, TCM, and antigen rapid tests. There were 218,183 suspected cases.
  - Indonesia confirmed 31,753 new cases, bringing the total number to 3,639,616. 39,716 patients recovered, bringing the total number to 3,036,194. 1,588 patients deceased, bringing the tally to 105,598. 510 municipalities and regencies had reported at least one positive case.
  - As of 18:00 WIB (UTC+7), 49,964,745 people had taken the first dose of vaccine while 23,528,130 had completed the process with the second dose.
- 8 August
  - 27,989,191 specimens had been tested from 18,932,354 people using RT-PCR, TCM, and antigen rapid tests. There were 238,649 suspected cases.
  - Indonesia confirmed 26,415 new cases, bringing the total number to 3,666,031. 48,508 patients recovered, bringing the total number to 3,084,702. 1,498 patients deceased, bringing the tally to 107,096. 510 municipalities and regencies had reported at least one positive case.
  - As of 18:00 WIB (UTC+7), 50,561,571 people had taken the first dose of vaccine while 24,047,214 had completed the process with the second dose.
  - There was a decrease of 23,591 active cases, the most ever.
- 9 August
  - 28,134,393 specimens had been tested from 19,031,741 people using RT-PCR, TCM, and antigen rapid tests. There were 256,748 suspected cases.
  - Indonesia confirmed 20,709 new cases, bringing the total number to 3,686,740. 44,959 patients recovered, bringing the total number to 3,129,661. 1,475 patients deceased, bringing the tally to 108,571. 510 municipalities and regencies had reported at least one positive case.
  - As of 18:00 WIB (UTC+7), 50,837,608 people had taken the first dose of vaccine while 24,615,964 had completed the process with the second dose.
  - There was a decrease of 25,725 active cases, the most ever.
  - The government extended the community activities restrictions enforcement until 16 August in Java and Bali and 23 August in other regions of the country.
- 10 August
  - 28,375,545 specimens had been tested from 19,177,891 people using RT-PCR, TCM, and antigen rapid tests. There were 273,575 suspected cases.
  - Indonesia confirmed 32,081 new cases, bringing the total number to 3,718,821. 41,486 patients recovered, bringing the total number to 3,171,147. 2,048 patients deceased, bringing the tally to 110,619. 510 municipalities and regencies had reported at least one positive case.
  - As of 18:00 WIB (UTC+7), 51,443,042 people had taken the first dose of vaccine while 25,249,992 had completed the process with the second dose.
- 11 August
  - 28,586,360 specimens had been tested from 19,313,350 people using RT-PCR, TCM, and antigen rapid tests. There were 286,417 suspected cases.
  - Indonesia confirmed 30,625 new cases, bringing the total number to 3,749,446. 39,931 patients recovered, bringing the total number to 3,211,078. 1,579 patients deceased, bringing the tally to 112,198. 510 municipalities and regencies had reported at least one positive case.
  - As of 18:00 WIB (UTC+7), 51,795,171 people had taken the first dose of vaccine while 25,502,849 had completed the process with the second dose.
- 12 August
  - 28,740,077 specimens had been tested from 19,449,602 people using RT-PCR, TCM, and antigen rapid tests. There were 302,070 suspected cases.
  - Indonesia confirmed 24,709 new cases, bringing the total number to 3,774,155. 36,637 patients recovered, bringing the total number to 3,247,715. 1,466 patients deceased, bringing the tally to 113,664. 510 municipalities and regencies had reported at least one positive case.
  - As of 18:00 WIB (UTC+7), 52,026,916 people had taken the first dose of vaccine while 26,144,162 had completed the process with the second dose.
  - For the first time ever, the positivity rate of antigen tests was higher than overall and non antigen positivity rates.
  - A nurse in Pluit, North Jakarta was found to be innocent after a video where she was allegedly inoculated an empty vaccine syringe went viral on the internet. She admitted it was a pure accident and not intentional as she was fatigued.
- 13 August
  - 28,966,108 specimens had been tested from 19,596,083 people using RT-PCR, TCM, and antigen rapid tests. There were 308,852 suspected cases.
  - Indonesia confirmed 30,788 new cases, bringing the total number to 3,804,943. 42,003 patients recovered, bringing the total number to 3,289,718. 1,432 patients deceased, bringing the tally to 115,096. 510 municipalities and regencies had reported at least one positive case.
  - Number of active cases decreased for the tenth consecutive day, the joint-longest record last set on 17 March 2021.
  - As of 18:00 WIB (UTC+7), 52,687,571 people had taken the first dose of vaccine while 27,055,840 had completed the process with the second dose. This meant at least 10% of Indonesian population had been fully vaccinated.
  - Five million doses of CoronaVac arrived in Indonesia.
  - Central Java overtook East Java as the province with most cumulative deaths, 24,697 to 24,619.
- 14 August
  - 29,188,690 specimens had been tested from 19,722,499 people using RT-PCR, TCM, and antigen rapid tests. There were 302,433 suspected cases.
  - Indonesia confirmed 28,598 new cases, bringing the total number to 3,833,541. 31,880 patients recovered, bringing the total number to 3,321,598. 1,270 patients deceased, bringing the tally to 116,366. 510 municipalities and regencies had reported at least one positive case.
  - Number of active cases decreased for the eleventh consecutive day, the longest ever.
  - As of 18:00 WIB (UTC+7), 53,365,941 people had taken the first dose of vaccine while 27,899,974 had completed the process with the second dose.
  - Governor of Jakarta Anies Baswedan revealed that there were 3.7 million people who were not Jakarta's residents but got vaccinated in the province. This could cause Jakarta to vaccinate more than its population.
  - Gorontalo became the last province to pass 10,000 cases.
- 15 August
  - 29,347,868 specimens had been tested from 19,812,267 people using RT-PCR, TCM, and antigen rapid tests. There were 300,912 suspected cases.
  - Indonesia confirmed 20,813 new cases, bringing the total number to 3,854,354. 30,361 patients recovered, bringing the total number to 3,351,959. 1,222 patients deceased, bringing the tally to 117,588. 510 municipalities and regencies had reported at least one positive case.
  - As of 18:00 WIB (UTC+7), 53,688,122 people had taken the first dose of vaccine while 28,112,285 had completed the process with the second dose.
- 16 August
  - 29,476,878 specimens had been tested from 19,890,644 people using RT-PCR, TCM, and antigen rapid tests. There were 306,164 suspected cases.
  - Indonesia confirmed 17,384 new cases, bringing the total number to 3,871,738. 29,925 patients recovered, bringing the total number to 3,381,884. 1,245 patients deceased, bringing the tally to 118,833. 510 municipalities and regencies had reported at least one positive case.
  - As of 18:00 WIB (UTC+7), 54,330,641 people had taken the first dose of vaccine while 28,819,961 had completed the process with the second dose.
  - Five million doses of CoronaVac arrived in Indonesia.
  - The Ministry of Health announced that they had decreased the maximum price of PCR tests to IDR495,000 in Java and Bali and IDR525,000 in other parts of Indonesia.
  - The government extended the community activities restrictions enforcement until 23 August in Java and Bali.
- 17 August
  - 29,659,094 specimens had been tested from 19,992,070 people using RT-PCR, TCM, and antigen rapid tests. There were 293,179 suspected cases.
  - Indonesia confirmed 20,741 new cases, bringing the total number to 3,892,479. 32,225 patients recovered, bringing the total number to 3,414,109. 1,180 patients deceased, bringing the tally to 120,013. 510 municipalities and regencies had reported at least one positive case.
  - As of 18:00 WIB (UTC+7), 55,098,856 people had taken the first dose of vaccine while 29,192,929 had completed the process with the second dose.
  - Jakarta allowed general public who were not health workers to be vaccinated with the Moderna vaccine.
- 18 August
  - 29,796,276 specimens had been tested from 20,070,696 people using RT-PCR, TCM, and antigen rapid tests. There were 282,964 suspected cases.
  - Indonesia confirmed 15,768 new cases, bringing the total number to 3,908,247. 29,794 patients recovered, bringing the total number to 3,443,903. 1,128 patients deceased, bringing the tally to 121,141. 510 municipalities and regencies had reported at least one positive case.
  - As of 12:00 WIB (UTC+7), 55,192,494 people had taken the first dose of vaccine while 29,403,345 had completed the process with the second dose. In addition, 297,422 health professionals had taken the third dose.
- 19 August
  - 30,010,686 specimens had been tested from 20,185,804 people using RT-PCR, TCM, and antigen rapid tests. There were 275,810 suspected cases.
  - Indonesia confirmed 22,053 new cases, bringing the total number to 3,930,300. 29,012 patients recovered, bringing the total number to 3,472,915. 1,492 patients deceased, bringing the tally to 122,633. 510 municipalities and regencies had reported at least one positive case.
  - As of 18:00 WIB (UTC+7), 55,637,234 people had taken the first dose of vaccine while 30,230,233 had completed the process with the second dose. In addition, 329,507 health professionals had taken the third dose.
  - 1.6 million doses of the Pfizer–BioNTech vaccine and 450,000 doses of the Oxford-AstraZeneca vaccine arrived in Indonesia.
- 20 August
  - 30,213,170 specimens had been tested from 20,299,651 people using RT-PCR, TCM, and antigen rapid tests. There were 269,480 suspected cases.
  - Indonesia confirmed 20,004 new cases, bringing the total number to 3,950,304. 26,122 patients recovered, bringing the total number to 3,499,037. 1,348 patients deceased, bringing the tally to 123,981. 510 municipalities and regencies had reported at least one positive case.
  - As of 18:00 WIB (UTC+7), 55,995,182 people had taken the first dose of vaccine while 30,585,478 had completed the process with the second dose. In addition, 365,335 health professionals had taken the third dose.
  - Five million doses of CoronaVac and 567,500 doses of the Oxford-AstraZeneca vaccine arrived in Indonesia.
- 21 August
  - 30,413,420 specimens had been tested from 20,415,957 people using RT-PCR, TCM, and antigen rapid tests. There were 268,065 suspected cases.
  - Indonesia confirmed 16,744 new cases, bringing the total number to 3,967,048. 23,011 patients recovered, bringing the total number to 3,522,048. 1,361 patients deceased, bringing the tally to 125,342. 510 municipalities and regencies had reported at least one positive case.
  - As of 18:00 WIB (UTC+7), 57,301,733 people had taken the first dose of vaccine while 31,586,214 had completed the process with the second dose. In addition, 423,627 health professionals had taken the third dose.
- 22 August
  - 30,561,830 specimens had been tested from 20,501,173 people using RT-PCR, TCM, and antigen rapid tests. There were 262,664 suspected cases.
  - Indonesia confirmed 12,408 new cases, bringing the total number to 3,979,456. 24,276 patients recovered, bringing the total number to 3,546,324. 1,030 patients deceased, bringing the tally to 126,372. 510 municipalities and regencies had reported at least one positive case.
  - As of 18:00 WIB (UTC+7), 57,338,901 people had taken the first dose of vaccine while 31,601,400 had completed the process with the second dose.
- 23 August
  - 30,684,567 specimens had been tested from 20,575,497 people using RT-PCR, TCM, and antigen rapid tests. There were 268,947 suspected cases.
  - Indonesia confirmed 9,604 new cases – the lowest since 15 June 2021, bringing the total number to 3,989,060. 24,758 patients recovered, bringing the total number to 3,571,082. 842 patients deceased – the lowest since 10 July 2021, bringing the tally to 127,214. 510 municipalities and regencies had reported at least one positive case.
  - As of 18:00 WIB (UTC+7), 58,021,180 people had taken the first dose of vaccine while 32,246,001 had completed the process with the second dose.
  - Five million doses of CoronaVac arrived in Indonesia.
  - The government extended the community activities restrictions enforcement until 30 August in Java and Bali and 6 September in other regions of the country.
- 24 August
  - 30,870,419 specimens had been tested from 20,699,341 people using RT-PCR, TCM, and antigen rapid tests. There were 260,434 suspected cases.
  - Indonesia confirmed 19,106 new cases, bringing the total number to 4,008,166; it became the 12th country in the world and the first in Southeast Asia to pass four million cases. 35,082 patients recovered, bringing the total number to 3,606,164. 1,038 patients deceased, bringing the tally to 128,252. 510 municipalities and regencies had reported at least one positive case.
  - As of 18:00 WIB (UTC+7), 58,710,455 people had taken the first dose of vaccine while 32,797,967 had completed the process with the second dose.
  - At least half of Jakarta's population had been fully vaccinated.
- 25 August
  - 31,119,684 specimens had been tested from 20,846,129 people using RT-PCR, TCM, and antigen rapid tests. There were 258,191 suspected cases.
  - Indonesia confirmed 18,671 new cases, bringing the total number to 4,026,837. 33,703 patients recovered, bringing the total number to 3,639,867. 1,041 patients deceased, bringing the tally to 129,293. 510 municipalities and regencies had reported at least one positive case.
  - As of 18:00 WIB (UTC+7), 59,379,587 people had taken the first dose of vaccine while 33,342,901 had completed the process with the second dose.
  - The National Agency of Drug and Food Control of Indonesia (BPOM) published an emergency use authorization for the Sputnik V vaccine.
- 26 August
  - 31,325,458 specimens had been tested from 20,974,752 people using RT-PCR, TCM, and antigen rapid tests. There were 255,969 suspected cases.
  - Indonesia confirmed 16,899 new cases, bringing the total number to 4,043,736. 30,099 patients recovered, bringing the total number to 3,669,966. 889 patients deceased, bringing the tally to 130,182. 510 municipalities and regencies had reported at least one positive case.
  - As of 18:00 WIB (UTC+7), 59,425,320 people had taken the first dose of vaccine while 33,356,097 had completed the process with the second dose.
- 27 August
  - 31,509,573 specimens had been tested from 21,082,273 people using RT-PCR, TCM, and antigen rapid tests. There were 250,014 suspected cases.
  - Indonesia confirmed 12,618 new cases, bringing the total number to 4,056,354. 19,290 patients recovered, bringing the total number to 3,689,256. 599 patients deceased, bringing the tally to 130,781. 510 municipalities and regencies had reported at least one positive case.
  - As of 18:00 WIB (UTC+7), 60,786,757 people had taken the first dose of vaccine while 34,434,438 had completed the process with the second dose. In addition, 575,561 health professionals had taken the third dose.
  - Five million doses of CoronaVac and 1.86 million doses of the Oxford-AstraZeneca vaccine arrived in Indonesia.
- 28 August
  - 31,691,247 specimens had been tested from 21,186,587 people using RT-PCR, TCM, and antigen rapid tests. There were 248,139 suspected cases.
  - Indonesia confirmed 10,050 new cases, bringing the total number to 4,066,404. 18,594 patients recovered, bringing the total number to 3,707,850. 591 patients deceased, bringing the tally to 131,372. 510 municipalities and regencies had reported at least one positive case.
  - As of 18:00 WIB (UTC+7), 61,463,766 people had taken the first dose of vaccine while 34,802,520 had completed the process with the second dose. In addition, 601,253 health professionals had taken the third dose.
- 29 August
  - 31,845,407 specimens had been tested from 21,279,118 people using RT-PCR, TCM, and antigen rapid tests. There were 249,836 suspected cases.
  - Indonesia confirmed 7,427 new cases, bringing the total number to 4,073,831. 16,468 patients recovered, bringing the total number to 3,724,318. 551 patients deceased, bringing the tally to 131,923. 510 municipalities and regencies had reported at least one positive case.
  - As of 18:00 WIB (UTC+7), 61,650,732 people had taken the first dose of vaccine while 34,877,174 had completed the process with the second dose. In addition, 604,614 health professionals had taken the third dose.
- 30 August
  - 31,970,830 specimens had been tested from 21,357,173 people using RT-PCR, TCM, and antigen rapid tests. There were 251,951 suspected cases.
  - Indonesia confirmed 5,436 new cases, bringing the total number to 4,079,267. 19,398 patients recovered, bringing the total number to 3,743,716. 568 patients deceased, bringing the tally to 132,491. 510 municipalities and regencies had reported at least one positive case.
  - As of 18:00 WIB (UTC+7), 62,622,828 people had taken the first dose of vaccine while 35,523,972 had completed the process with the second dose.
  - 9.2 million doses of CoronaVac arrived in Indonesia.
  - The government extended the community activities restrictions enforcement until 6 September in Java and Bali.
- 31 August
  - 32,195,072 specimens had been tested from 21,487,697 people using RT-PCR, TCM, and antigen rapid tests. There were 248,333 suspected cases.
  - Indonesia confirmed 10,534 new cases, bringing the total number to 4,089,801. 16,781 patients recovered, bringing the total number to 3,760,497. 532 patients deceased, bringing the tally to 133,023. 510 municipalities and regencies had reported at least one positive case.
  - As of 21:00 WIB (UTC+7), 63,447,230 people had taken the first dose of vaccine while 36,049,569 had completed the process with the second dose. In addition, 640,532 health professionals had taken the third dose.

== September ==
- 1 September
  - 32,415,133 specimens had been tested from 21,621,776 people using RT-PCR, TCM, and antigen rapid tests. There were 251,359 suspected cases.
  - Indonesia confirmed 10,337 new cases, bringing the total number to 4,100,138. 16,394 patients recovered, bringing the total number to 3,776,891. 653 patients deceased, bringing the tally to 133,676. 510 municipalities and regencies had reported at least one positive case.
  - As of 18:00 WIB (UTC+7), 64,221,751 people had taken the first dose of vaccine while 36,453,133 had completed the process with the second dose. In addition, 653,351 health professionals had taken the third dose.
  - 583,400 million doses of the Oxford–AstraZeneca vaccine arrived in Indonesia.
  - Ministry of Health announced that they had decreased the maximum price of antigen rapid tests to IDR99,000 in Java and Bali and IDR109,000 in other parts of Indonesia.
- 2 September
  - 32,623,848 specimens had been tested from 21,750,629 people using RT-PCR, TCM, and antigen rapid tests. There were 252,017 suspected cases.
  - Indonesia confirmed 8,955 new cases, bringing the total number to 4,109,093. 21,208 patients recovered, bringing the total number to 3,798,099. 680 patients deceased, bringing the tally to 134,356. 510 municipalities and regencies had reported at least one positive case.
  - As of 18:00 WIB (UTC+7), 65,228,120 people had taken the first dose of vaccine while 37,154,016 had completed the process with the second dose. In addition, 668,538 health professionals had taken the third dose.
  - 1.2 million doses of the Pfizer–BioNTech vaccine and 500,000 doses of the Oxford-AstraZeneca vaccine arrived in Indonesia.
- 3 September
  - 32,833,137 specimens had been tested from 21,878,972 people using RT-PCR, TCM, and antigen rapid tests. There were 256,777 suspected cases.
  - Indonesia confirmed 7,797 new cases, bringing the total number to 4,116,890. 15,544 patients recovered, bringing the total number to 3,813,643. 574 patients deceased, bringing the tally to 134,930. 510 municipalities and regencies had reported at least one positive case.
  - As of 18:00 WIB (UTC+7), 65,949,542 people had taken the first dose of vaccine while 37,721,157 had completed the process with the second dose. In addition, 697,163 health professionals had taken the third dose.
  - President Joko Widodo's vaccine certificate had become publicly accessible. This caused people to demand the Ministry of Communication and Information Technology to increase the safety of the PeduliLindungi app.
  - The overall daily positivity rate hit 6.08%, the lowest ever.
- 4 September
  - 33,043,568 specimens had been tested from 22,007,274 people using RT-PCR, TCM, and antigen rapid tests. There were 259,246 suspected cases.
  - Indonesia confirmed 6,727 new cases, bringing the total number to 4,123,617. 13,806 patients recovered, bringing the total number to 3,827,449. 539 patients deceased, bringing the tally to 135,469. 510 municipalities and regencies had reported at least one positive case.
  - As of 18:00 WIB (UTC+7), 66,735,737 people had taken the first dose of vaccine while 38,206,660 had completed the process with the second dose. In addition, 706,578 health professionals had taken the third dose.
  - 207,000 doses of the Oxford-AstraZeneca vaccine arrived in Indonesia.
  - The overall daily positivity rate hit 5.24%, the lowest ever.
- 5 September
  - 33,215,453 specimens had been tested from 22,112,218 people using RT-PCR, TCM, and antigen rapid tests. There were 264,081 suspected cases.
  - Indonesia confirmed 5,403 new cases, bringing the total number to 4,129,020. 10,191 patients recovered, bringing the total number to 3,837,640. 392 patients deceased, bringing the tally to 135,861. 510 municipalities and regencies had reported at least one positive case.
  - As of 18:00 WIB (UTC+7), 66,781,416 people had taken the first dose of vaccine while 38,222,022 had completed the process with the second dose. In addition, 713,068 health professionals had taken the third dose.
  - The overall daily positivity rate hit 5.15%, the lowest ever.
- 6 September
  - 33,368,395 specimens had been tested from 22,208,725 people using RT-PCR, TCM, and antigen rapid tests. There were 108,666 suspected cases.
  - Indonesia confirmed 4,413 new cases, bringing the total number to 4,133,433. 13,049 patients recovered, bringing the total number to 3,850,689. 612 patients deceased, bringing the tally to 136,473. 510 municipalities and regencies had reported at least one positive case.
  - As of 18:00 WIB (UTC+7), 67,825,740 people had taken the first dose of vaccine while 38,848,452 had completed the process with the second dose. In addition, 722,837 health professionals had taken the third dose.
  - Five million doses of CoronaVac arrived in Indonesia.
  - The government extended the community activities restrictions enforcement until 13 September in Java and Bali and 20 September in other regions of the country.
  - The overall daily positivity rate hit 4.57%, the lowest ever. This was also the first time that the positivity rate fell below 5% since the pandemic began in Indonesia.
- 7 September
  - 33,620,034 specimens had been tested from 22,367,690 people using RT-PCR, TCM, and antigen rapid tests. There were 127,465 suspected cases.
  - Indonesia confirmed 7,201 new cases, bringing the total number to 4,140,634. 14,159 patients recovered, bringing the total number to 3,864,848. 683 patients deceased, bringing the tally to 137,156. 510 municipalities and regencies had reported at least one positive case.
  - As of 18:00 WIB (UTC+7), 68,814,014 people had taken the first dose of vaccine while 39,442,720 had completed the process with the second dose. In addition, 733,503 health professionals had taken the third dose.
  - The National Agency of Drug and Food Control (BPOM) published an emergency use authorization for the Janssen vaccine and Convidecia.
  - The overall daily positivity rate hit 4.53%, the lowest ever.
- 8 September
  - 33,852,336 specimens had been tested from 22,513,350 people using RT-PCR, TCM, and antigen rapid tests. There were 150,134 suspected cases.
  - Indonesia confirmed 6,731 new cases, bringing the total number to 4,147,365. 11,912 patients recovered, bringing the total number to 3,876,760. 626 patients deceased, bringing the tally to 137,782. 510 municipalities and regencies had reported at least one positive case.
  - As of 18:00 WIB (UTC+7), 69,776,734 people had taken the first dose of vaccine while 39,969,311 had completed the process with the second dose. In addition, 741,907 health professionals had taken the third dose.
  - 500,000 doses of the Oxford-AstraZeneca vaccine from Australia arrived in Indonesia.
- 9 September
  - 34,083,614 specimens had been tested from 22,661,808 people using RT-PCR, TCM, and antigen rapid tests. There were 180,998 suspected cases.
  - Indonesia confirmed 5,990 new cases, bringing the total number to 4,153,355. 10,650 patients recovered, bringing the total number to 3,887,410. 334 patients deceased, bringing the tally to 138,116. 510 municipalities and regencies had reported at least one positive case.
  - As of 18:00 WIB (UTC+7), 70,854,073 people had taken the first dose of vaccine while 40,610,338 had completed the process with the second dose. In addition, 750,507 health professionals had taken the third dose.
  - The overall daily positivity rate hit 4.03%, the lowest ever.
- 10 September
  - 34,319,295 specimens had been tested from 22,811,588 people using RT-PCR, TCM, and antigen rapid tests. There were 209,579 suspected cases.
  - Indonesia confirmed 5,376 new cases, bringing the total number to 4,158,731. 14,356 patients recovered, bringing the total number to 3,901,766. 315 patients deceased, bringing the tally to 138,431. 510 municipalities and regencies had reported at least one positive case.
  - As of 18:00 WIB (UTC+7), 71,666,085 people had taken the first dose of vaccine while 41,182,184 had completed the process with the second dose. In addition, 767,621 health professionals had taken the third dose.
  - 639,990 doses of the Pfizer–BioNTech vaccine, 973,700 doses of the Oxford-AstraZeneca vaccine, and, 2.08 million doses of CoronaVac arrived in Indonesia.
  - The overall daily positivity rate hit 3.59%, the lowest ever.
- 11 September
  - 34,550,865 specimens had been tested from 22,954,723 people using RT-PCR, TCM, and antigen rapid tests. There were 229,927 suspected cases.
  - Indonesia confirmed 5,001 new cases, bringing the total number to 4,163,732. 7,586 patients recovered, bringing the total number to 3,909,352. 270 patients deceased, bringing the tally to 138,701. 510 municipalities and regencies had reported at least one positive case.
  - As of 18:00 WIB (UTC+7), 72,611,237 people had taken the first dose of vaccine while 41,631,343 had completed the process with the second dose. In addition, 777,759 health professionals had taken the third dose.
  - 500,000 doses of the Janssen vaccine and 2.075 million doses of CoronaVac arrived in Indonesia.
  - The overall daily positivity rate hit 3.49%, the lowest ever.
- 12 September
  - 34,748,917 specimens had been tested from 23,078,739 people using RT-PCR, TCM, and antigen rapid tests. There were 258,210 suspected cases.
  - Indonesia confirmed 3,779 new cases, bringing the total number to 4,167,511. 9,401 patients recovered, bringing the total number to 3,918,753. 188 patients deceased – the lowest since 15 June 2021, bringing the tally to 138,889. 510 municipalities and regencies had reported at least one positive case.
  - As of 18:00 WIB (UTC+7), 72,874,674 people had taken the first dose of vaccine while 41,784,218 had completed the process with the second dose. In addition, 779,254 health professionals had taken the third dose.
  - The overall daily positivity rate hit 3.05%, the lowest ever.
- 13 September
  - 34,926,151 specimens had been tested from 23,199,268 people using RT-PCR, TCM, and antigen rapid tests. There were 286,170 suspected cases.
  - Indonesia confirmed 2,577 new cases – the lowest since 15 May 2021, bringing the total number to 4,170,088. 12,474 patients recovered, bringing the total number to 3,931,227. 276 patients deceased, bringing the tally to 139,165. 510 municipalities and regencies had reported at least one positive case.
  - As of 18:00 WIB (UTC+7), 73,837,947 people had taken the first dose of vaccine while 42,327,685 had completed the process with the second dose. In addition, 792,385 health professionals had taken the third dose.
  - The number of active cases dipped below 100,000 for the first time since 8 June 2021.
  - The overall daily positivity rate hit 2.14%, the lowest ever.
  - The government extended the community activities restrictions enforcement until 20 September in Java and Bali.
- 14 September
  - 35,204,831 specimens had been tested from 23,384,990 people using RT-PCR, TCM, and antigen rapid tests. There were 304,706 suspected cases.
  - Indonesia confirmed 4,128 new cases, bringing the total number to 4,174,216. 11,246 patients recovered, bringing the total number to 3,942,473. 250 patients deceased, bringing the tally to 139,415. 510 municipalities and regencies had reported at least one positive case.
  - As of 18:00 WIB (UTC+7), 74,816,543 people had taken the first dose of vaccine while 42,777,950 had completed the process with the second dose. In addition, 805,331 health professionals had taken the third dose.
  - 1.8 million doses of CoronaVac arrived in Indonesia.
- 15 September
  - 35,437,272 specimens had been tested from 23,538,483 people using RT-PCR, TCM, and antigen rapid tests. There were 333,326 suspected cases.
  - Indonesia confirmed 3,948 new cases, bringing the total number to 4,178,164. 11,046 patients recovered, bringing the total number to 3,953,519. 267 patients deceased, bringing the tally to 139,682. 510 municipalities and regencies had reported at least one positive case.
  - As of 18:00 WIB (UTC+7), 75,789,533 people had taken the first dose of vaccine while 43,283,572 had completed the process with the second dose. In addition, 816,766 health professionals had taken the third dose.
  - 274,950 doses of the Pfizer–BioNTech vaccine arrived in Indonesia.
- 16 September
  - 35,536,402 specimens had been tested from 23,593,249 people using RT-PCR, TCM, and antigen rapid tests; in the previous 24 hours, only 99,130 tests were conducted, the lowest since 28 June 2021. There were 354,479 suspected cases.
  - Indonesia confirmed 3,145 new cases, bringing the total number to 4,181,309. 14,633 patients recovered, bringing the total number to 3,968,152. 237 patients deceased, bringing the tally to 139,919. 510 municipalities and regencies had reported at least one positive case.
  - As of 18:00 WIB (UTC+7), 76,582,211 people had taken the first dose of vaccine while 43,742,746 had completed the process with the second dose. In addition, 823,765 health professionals had taken the third dose.
  - 2.5 million doses of the Pfizer–BioNTech vaccine and 968,360 doses of the Oxford-AstraZeneca vaccine arrived in Indonesia.
- 17 September
  - 35,924,694 specimens had been tested from 23,886,703 people using RT-PCR, TCM, and antigen rapid tests; in the previous 24 hours, a record-breaking 388,292 tests were conducted to 293,454 people – another record-breaker. There were 234,397 suspected cases.
  - Indonesia confirmed 3,835 new cases, bringing the total number to 4,185,144. 7,912 patients recovered, bringing the total number to 3,976,064. 219 patients deceased, bringing the tally to 140,138. 510 municipalities and regencies had reported at least one positive case.
  - As of 18:00 WIB (UTC+7), 77,887,882 people had taken the first dose of vaccine while 44,331,212 had completed the process with the second dose. In addition, 843,987 health professionals had taken the third dose.
  - 1.755 million doses of the Pfizer–BioNTech vaccine, 1.878 million doses of the Oxford-AstraZeneca vaccine, and five million doses of CoronaVac arrived in Indonesia.
  - The overall daily positivity rate hit 1.31%, the lowest ever.
- 18 September
  - 36,200,788 specimens had been tested from 24,087,841 people using RT-PCR, TCM, and antigen rapid tests. There were 364,144 suspected cases.
  - Indonesia confirmed 3,385 new cases, bringing the total number to 4,188,529. 7,076 patients recovered, bringing the total number to 3,983,140. 185 patients deceased, bringing the tally to 140,323. 510 municipalities and regencies had reported at least one positive case.
  - As of 18:00 WIB (UTC+7), 79,048,736 people had taken the first dose of vaccine while 44,945,738 had completed the process with the second dose. In addition, 852,634 health professionals had taken the third dose.
- 19 September
  - 36,393,201 specimens had been tested from 24,221,606 people using RT-PCR, TCM, and antigen rapid tests. There were 234,824 suspected cases.
  - Indonesia confirmed 2,234 new cases – the lowest since 24 August 2020 (1,877), bringing the total number to 4,190,763. 6,186 patients recovered, bringing the total number to 3,989,326. 145 patients deceased, bringing the tally to 140,468. 510 municipalities and regencies had reported at least one positive case.
  - As of 18:00 WIB (UTC+7), 79,615,274 people had taken the first dose of vaccine while 45,193,229 had completed the process with the second dose. In addition, 856,071 health professionals had taken the third dose.
  - 1.1 million doses of the Pfizer–BioNTech vaccine arrived in Indonesia.
  - North Maluku reported zero cases, becoming the first province to do so since Gorontalo on 11 July 2021.
- 20 September
  - 36,595,996 specimens had been tested from 24,372,320 people using RT-PCR, TCM, and antigen rapid tests. There were 346,285 suspected cases.
  - Indonesia confirmed 1,932 new cases – the lowest since 24 August 2020, bringing the total number to 4,192,695. 6,799 patients recovered, bringing the total number to 3,996,125. 166 patients deceased, bringing the tally to 140,634. 510 municipalities and regencies had reported at least one positive case.
  - As of 18:00 WIB (UTC+7), 79,659,329 people had taken the first dose of vaccine while 45,226,706 had completed the process with the second dose. In addition, 856,619 health professionals had taken the third dose.
  - Five million doses of CoronaVac arrived in Indonesia.
  - The government extended the community activities restrictions enforcement until 4 October.
  - The overall daily positivity rate hit 1.28%, the lowest ever.
- 21 September
  - 36,844,653 specimens had been tested from 24,548,760 people using RT-PCR, TCM, and antigen rapid tests. There were 393,404 suspected cases.
  - Indonesia confirmed 3,263 new cases, bringing the total number to 4,195,958. 6,581 patients recovered, bringing the total number to 4,002,706. 171 patients deceased, bringing the tally to 140,805. 510 municipalities and regencies had reported at least one positive case.
  - As of 18:00 WIB (UTC+7), 81,081,634 people had taken the first dose of vaccine while 46,124,373 had completed the process with the second dose. In addition, 868,736 health professionals had taken the third dose.
  - Five million doses of CoronaVac and 200,000 doses of the Sinopharm BIBP vaccine arrived in Indonesia.
- 22 September
  - 37,100,816 specimens had been tested from 24,734,156 people using RT-PCR, TCM, and antigen rapid tests. There were 373,201 suspected cases.
  - Indonesia confirmed 2,720 new cases, bringing the total number to 4,198,678. 5,356 patients recovered, bringing the total number to 4,008,062. 149 patients deceased, bringing the tally to 140,954. 510 municipalities and regencies had reported at least one positive case.
  - The number of active cases dropped below 50,000 for the first time since 9 September 2020.
  - As of 18:00 WIB (UTC+7), 82,726,190 people had taken the first dose of vaccine while 46,771,007 had completed the process with the second dose. In addition, 875,713 health professionals had taken the third dose.
  - 684,900 doses of the Oxford-AstraZeneca vaccine arrived in Indonesia.
- 23 September
  - 37,348,941 specimens had been tested from 24,908,070 people using RT-PCR, TCM, and antigen rapid tests. There were 353,860 suspected cases.
  - Indonesia confirmed 2,881 new cases, bringing the total number to 4,201,559. 4,386 patients recovered, bringing the total number to 4,012,448. 160 patients deceased, bringing the tally to 141,114. 510 municipalities and regencies had reported at least one positive case.
  - As of 18:00 WIB (UTC+7), 84,120,057 people had taken the first dose of vaccine while 47,333,759 had completed the process with the second dose. In addition, 884,329 health professionals had taken the third dose.
  - 1.24 million doses of the Oxford-AstraZeneca vaccine and 2.17 million doses of the Pfizer–BioNTech vaccine arrived in Indonesia.
- 24 September
  - 37,601,537 specimens had been tested from 25,081,043 people using RT-PCR, TCM, and antigen rapid tests. There were 370,614 suspected cases.
  - Indonesia confirmed 2,557 new cases, bringing the total number to 4,204,116. 4,607 patients recovered, bringing the total number to 4,017,055. 144 patients deceased, bringing the tally to 141,258. 510 municipalities and regencies had reported at least one positive case.
  - As of 18:00 WIB (UTC+7), 85,013,909 people had taken the first dose of vaccine while 47,774,993 had completed the process with the second dose. In addition, 892,189 health professionals had taken the third dose.
  - Two million doses of CoronaVac arrived in Indonesia.
- 25 September
  - 37,859,340 specimens had been tested from 25,262,904 people using RT-PCR, TCM, and antigen rapid tests. There were 375,061 suspected cases.
  - Indonesia confirmed 2,137 new cases, bringing the total number to 4,206,253. 3,746 patients recovered, bringing the total number to 4,020,801. 123 patients deceased, bringing the tally to 141,381. 510 municipalities and regencies had reported at least one positive case.
  - As of 18:00 WIB (UTC+7), 85,942,484 people had taken the first dose of vaccine while 48,261,414 had completed the process with the second dose. In addition, 901,315 health professionals had taken the third dose.
  - The overall daily positivity rate hit 1.17%, the lowest ever.
- 26 September
  - 38,076,424 specimens had been tested from 25,411,647 people using RT-PCR, TCM, and antigen rapid tests. There were 380,082 suspected cases.
  - Indonesia confirmed 1,760 new cases – the lowest since 10 August 2020, bringing the total number to 4,208,013. 2,976 patients recovered – the lowest since 20 September 2020, bringing the total number to 4,023,777. 86 patients deceased – the lowest since 26 March 2021, bringing the tally to 141,467. 510 municipalities and regencies had reported at least one positive case.
  - The number of active cases reached 42,769, the lowest since 2 September 2020.
  - As of 18:00 WIB (UTC+7), 86,745,370 people had taken the first dose of vaccine while 48,669,727 had completed the process with the second dose. In addition, 907,122 health professionals had taken the third dose.
- 27 September
  - 38,291,015 specimens had been tested from 25,563,613 people using RT-PCR, TCM, and antigen rapid tests. There were 388,341 suspected cases.
  - Indonesia confirmed 1,390 new cases – the lowest since 13 July 2020, bringing the total number to 4,209,403. 3,771 patients recovered, bringing the total number to 4,027,548. 118 patients deceased, bringing the tally to 141,585. 510 municipalities and regencies had reported at least one positive case.
  - The number of active cases reached 40,270, the lowest since 29 August 2020.
  - As of 18:00 WIB (UTC+7), 87,740,838 people had taken the first dose of vaccine while 49,196,642 had completed the process with the second dose. In addition, 912,955 health professionals had taken the third dose.
  - The overall daily positivity rate hit 0.91%, the lowest ever. This also marked the first time that the rate fell below 1%.
- 28 September
  - 38,566,783 specimens had been tested from 25,757,177 people using RT-PCR, TCM, and antigen rapid tests. There were 381,253 suspected cases.
  - Indonesia confirmed 2,057 new cases, bringing the total number to 4,211,460. 3,551 patients recovered, bringing the total number to 4,031,099. 124 patients deceased, bringing the tally to 141,709. 510 municipalities and regencies had reported at least one positive case.
  - The number of active cases reached 38,652, the lowest since 28 August 2020.
  - As of 18:00 WIB (UTC+7), 89,199,337 people had taken the first dose of vaccine while 50,029,297 had completed the process with the second dose. In addition, 920,492 health professionals had taken the third dose.
- 29 September
  - 38,845,350 specimens had been tested from 25,954,487 people using RT-PCR, TCM, and antigen rapid tests. There were 378,922 suspected cases.
  - Indonesia confirmed 1,954 new cases, bringing the total number to 4,213,414. 3,077 patients recovered, bringing the total number to 4,034,176. 117 patients deceased, bringing the tally to 141,826. 510 municipalities and regencies had reported at least one positive case.
  - The number of active cases reached 37,412, the lowest since 27 August 2020.
  - As of 18:00 WIB (UTC+7), 90,358,926 people had taken the first dose of vaccine while 50,686,725 had completed the process with the second dose. In addition, 928,323 health professionals had taken the third dose.
- 30 September
  - 39,121,485 specimens had been tested from 26,148,296 people using RT-PCR, TCM, and antigen rapid tests. There were 384,228 suspected cases.
  - Indonesia confirmed 1,690 new cases, bringing the total number to 4,215,104. 2,848 patients recovered, bringing the total number to 4,037,024. 113 patients deceased, bringing the tally to 141,939. 510 municipalities and regencies had reported at least one positive case.
  - The number of active cases reached 36,141, the lowest since 11 July 2020.
  - As of 18:00 WIB (UTC+7), 91,076,921 people had taken the first dose of vaccine while 51,111,864 had completed the process with the second dose. In addition, 932,482 health professionals had taken the third dose.
  - The overall daily positivity rate hit 0.87%, the lowest ever.
  - 796,800 doses of the Oxford-AstraZeneca vaccine from Italy arrived in Indonesia.
  - The government allowed those who had been infected with COVID-19 to be vaccinated one month after recovered (for mild symptoms) and three months (for severe symptoms). The previous time span was three months (for both mild and severe symptoms).

== October ==
- 1 October
  - 39,372,853 specimens had been tested from 26,319,442 people using RT-PCR, TCM, and antigen rapid tests. There were 384,552 suspected cases.
  - Indonesia confirmed 1,624 new cases, bringing the total number to 4,216,728. 2,811 patients recovered, bringing the total number to 4,039,835. 87 patients deceased, bringing the tally to 142,026. 510 municipalities and regencies had reported at least one positive case.
  - The number of active cases reached 34,867, the lowest since 10 July 2020.
  - As of 18:00 WIB (UTC+7), 92,659,062 people had taken the first dose of vaccine while 52,013,663 had completed the process with the second dose.
  - 705,300 doses of the Oxford–AstraZeneca vaccine and 453,960 doses of the Pfizer–BioNTech vaccine arrived in Indonesia.
- 2 October
  - 39,609,506 specimens had been tested from 26,479,441 people using RT-PCR, TCM, and antigen rapid tests. There were 381,124 suspected cases.
  - Indonesia confirmed 1,414 new cases, bringing the total number to 4,218,142. 2,380 patients recovered, bringing the total number to 4,042,215. 89 patients deceased, bringing the tally to 142,115. 510 municipalities and regencies had reported at least one positive case.
  - The number of active cases reached 33,812, the lowest since 9 July 2020.
  - As of 18:00 WIB (UTC+7), 93,513,388 people had taken the first dose of vaccine while 52,581,059 had completed the process with the second dose. In addition, 956,288 health professionals had taken the third dose.
  - 600,000 doses of the Oxford-AstraZeneca vaccine arrived in Indonesia.
- 3 October
  - 39,847,564 specimens had been tested from 26,640,081 people using RT-PCR, TCM, and antigen rapid tests. There were 388,368 suspected cases.
  - Indonesia confirmed 1,142 new cases – the lowest since 29 June 2020, bringing the total number to 4,219,284. 2,020 patients recovered, bringing the total number to 4,044,235. 58 patients deceased – the lowest since 17 August 2020, bringing the tally to 142,173. 510 municipalities and regencies had reported at least one positive case.
  - The number of active cases was 32,876, the lowest since 7 July 2020.
  - As of 18:00 WIB (UTC+7), 93,908,762 people had taken the first dose of vaccine while 52,682,442 had completed the process with the second dose. In addition, 960,433 health professionals had taken the third dose.
  - 800,280 doses of the Pfizer–BioNTech vaccine arrived in Indonesia.
  - The overall daily positivity rate hit 0.71%, the lowest ever.
- 4 October
  - 40,059,078 specimens had been tested from 26,786,789 people using RT-PCR, TCM, and antigen rapid tests. There were 108,264 suspected cases.
  - Indonesia confirmed 922 new cases – the lowest since 21 June 2020, bringing the total number to 4,220,206. 2,656 patients recovered, bringing the total number to 4,046,891. 88 patients deceased, bringing the tally to 142,261. 510 municipalities and regencies had reported at least one positive case.
  - The number of active cases was 31,054, the lowest since 4 July 2020.
  - As of 18:00 WIB (UTC+7), 94,636,843 people had taken the first dose of vaccine while 53,323,734 had completed the process with the second dose. In addition, 965,199 health professionals had taken the third dose.
  - The government extended the community activities restrictions enforcement until 18 October.
  - The overall daily positivity rate hit 0.63%, the lowest ever.
- 5 October
  - 40,314,564 specimens had been tested from 26,963,512 people using RT-PCR, TCM, and antigen rapid tests. There were 139,156 suspected cases.
  - Indonesia confirmed 1,404 new cases, bringing the total number to 4,221,610. 2,558 patients recovered, bringing the total number to 4,049,449. 77 patients deceased, bringing the tally to 142,338. 510 municipalities and regencies had reported at least one positive case.
  - The number of active cases was 29,823, the lowest since 1 July 2020.
  - As of 18:00 WIB (UTC+7), 95,311,422 people had taken the first dose of vaccine while 53,992,227 had completed the process with the second dose. In addition, 971,514 health professionals had taken the third dose.
- 6 October
  - 40,589,003 specimens had been tested from 27,153,742 people using RT-PCR, TCM, and antigen rapid tests. There were 170,894 suspected cases.
  - Indonesia confirmed 1,484 new cases, bringing the total number to 4,223,094. 2,851 patients recovered, bringing the total number to 4,052,300. 75 patients deceased, bringing the tally to 142,413. 510 municipalities and regencies had reported at least one positive case.
  - The number of active cases was 28,381, the lowest since 29 June 2020.
  - As of 18:00 WIB (UTC+7), 96,105,575 people had taken the first dose of vaccine while 54,720,413 had completed the process with the second dose. In addition, 977,756 health professionals had taken the third dose.
- 7 October
  - 40,848,558 specimens had been tested from 27,334,864 people using RT-PCR, TCM, and antigen rapid tests. There were 213,616 suspected cases.
  - Indonesia confirmed 1,393 new cases, bringing the total number to 4,224,487. 1,946 patients recovered, bringing the total number to 4,054,246. 81 patients deceased, bringing the tally to 142,494. 510 municipalities and regencies had reported at least one positive case.
  - The number of active cases was 27,747, the lowest since 26 June 2020.
  - As of 18:00 WIB (UTC+7), 96,880,752 people had taken the first dose of vaccine while 55,161,303 had completed the process with the second dose. In addition, 981,931 health professionals had taken the third dose.
  - 1.2 million doses of the Pfizer–BioNTech vaccine arrived in Indonesia.
  - The National Agency of Drug and Food Control of Indonesia (BPOM) published the emergency use authorization for Zifivax vaccine.
- 8 October
  - 41,116,704 specimens had been tested from 27,516,374 people using RT-PCR, TCM, and antigen rapid tests. There were 253,067 suspected cases.
  - Indonesia confirmed 1,384 new cases, bringing the total number to 4,225,871. 3,514 patients recovered, bringing the total number to 4,057,760. 66 patients deceased, bringing the tally to 142,560. 510 municipalities and regencies had reported at least one positive case.
  - The number of active cases was 25,551, the lowest since 21 June 2020.
  - As of 18:00 WIB (UTC+7), 98,380,753 people had taken the first dose of vaccine while 56,265,546 had completed the process with the second dose. In addition, 994,915 health professionals had taken the third dose.
  - 245,440 doses of the Oxford-AstraZeneca vaccine arrived in Indonesia.
- 9 October
  - 41,383,754 specimens had been tested from 27,699,284 people using RT-PCR, TCM, and antigen rapid tests. There were 292,253 suspected cases.
  - Indonesia confirmed 1,167 new cases, bringing the total number to 4,227,038. 1,507 patients recovered, bringing the total number to 4,059,267. 52 patients deceased – the least since 15 August 2020, bringing the tally to 142,612. 510 municipalities and regencies had reported at least one positive case.
  - The number of active cases was 25,159, the lowest since 21 June 2020.
  - As of 18:00 WIB (UTC+7), 99,823,091 people had taken the first dose of vaccine while 57,223,779 had completed the process with the second dose. In addition, 1,012,911 health professionals had taken the third dose.
- 10 October
  - 41,603,403 specimens had been tested from 27,843,954 people using RT-PCR, TCM, and antigen rapid tests. There were 331,377 suspected cases.
  - Indonesia confirmed 894 new cases – the lowest since 21 June 2020, bringing the total number to 4,227,932. 1,584 patients recovered, bringing the total number to 4,060,851. 39 patients deceased – the least since 21 June 2020, bringing the tally to 142,651. 510 municipalities and regencies had reported at least one positive case.
  - The number of active cases was 24,430, the lowest since 19 June 2020.
  - As of 18:00 WIB (UTC+7), 100,180,126 people had taken the first dose of vaccine while 57,520,681 had completed the process with the second dose. In addition, 1,015,773 health professionals had taken the third dose.
  - The overall daily positivity rate hit 0.62%, the lowest ever.
  - Two million doses of the Pfizer–BioNTech vaccine arrived in Indonesia.
- 11 October
  - 41,828,486 specimens had been tested from 27,995,924 people using RT-PCR, TCM, and antigen rapid tests. There were 368,489 suspected cases.
  - Indonesia confirmed 620 new cases – the lowest since 4 June 2020, bringing the total number to 4,228,552. 2,444 patients recovered, bringing the total number to 4,063,295. 65 patients deceased, bringing the tally to 142,716. 510 municipalities and regencies had reported at least one positive case.
  - The number of active cases was 22,541, the lowest since 16 June 2020.
  - As of 18:00 WIB (UTC+7), 100,879,405 people had taken the first dose of vaccine while 57,988,923 had completed the process with the second dose. In addition, 1,021,761 health professionals had taken the third dose.
  - The overall daily positivity rate hit 0.41%, the lowest ever.
- 12 October
  - 42,104,849 specimens had been tested from 28,186,327 people using RT-PCR, TCM, and antigen rapid tests. There were 396,064 suspected cases.
  - Indonesia confirmed 1,261 new cases, bringing the total number to 4,229,813. 2,130 patients recovered, bringing the total number to 4,065,425. 47 patients deceased, bringing the tally to 142,763. 510 municipalities and regencies had reported at least one positive case.
  - The number of active cases was 21,625, the lowest since 14 June 2020.
  - As of 18:00 WIB (UTC+7), 101,670,787 people had taken the first dose of vaccine while 58,718,974 had completed the process with the second dose. In addition, 1,029,006 health professionals had taken the third dose.
- 13 October
  - 42,366,580 specimens had been tested from 28,367,503 people using RT-PCR, TCM, and antigen rapid tests. There were 424,799 suspected cases.
  - Indonesia confirmed 1,233 new cases, bringing the total number to 4,231,046. 2,259 patients recovered, bringing the total number to 4,067,684. 48 patients deceased, bringing the tally to 142,811. 510 municipalities and regencies had reported at least one positive case.
  - The number of active cases was 20,551, the lowest since 11 June 2020.
  - As of 18:00 WIB (UTC+7), 103,193,499 people had taken the first dose of vaccine while 59,686,010 had completed the process with the second dose. In addition, 1,035,911 health professionals had taken the third dose.
  - 688,800 doses of the Oxford-AstraZeneca vaccine arrived in Indonesia.
  - The government renewed the travelling terms and requirements for international travellers, including Indonesians. They could only enter the country through five entry points and had to perform a PCR test before their departure and followed mandatory quarantine when they arrived (five days for those who came from low-risk countries and fourteen days for high-risk ones). They would be tested again at the end of the quarantine period.
- 14 October
  - 42,625,525 specimens had been tested from 28,533,210 people using RT-PCR, TCM, and antigen rapid tests. There were 460,541 suspected cases.
  - Indonesia confirmed 1,053 new cases, bringing the total number to 4,232,099. 1,715 patients recovered, bringing the total number to 4,069,399. 37 patients deceased – the lowest since 28 June 2020, bringing the tally to 142,848. 510 municipalities and regencies had reported at least one positive case.
  - The number of active cases was 19,852, the lowest since 9 June 2020.
  - As of 18:00 WIB (UTC+7), 104,877,855 people had taken the first dose of vaccine while 60,768,173 had completed the process with the second dose. In addition, 1,115,105 health professionals had taken the third dose.
  - 672,600 doses of the Oxford-AstraZeneca vaccine and 601,380 doses of the Pfizer–BioNTech vaccine arrived in Indonesia.
- 15 October
  - 42,892,863 specimens had been tested from 28,713,630 people using RT-PCR, TCM, and antigen rapid tests. There were 487,364 suspected cases.
  - Indonesia confirmed 915 new cases, bringing the total number to 4,233,014. 1,408 patients recovered, bringing the total number to 4,070,807. 41 patients deceased, bringing the tally to 142,889. 510 municipalities and regencies had reported at least one positive case.
  - The number of active cases was 19,318, the lowest since 8 June 2020.
  - As of 18:00 WIB (UTC+7), 105,800,767 people had taken the first dose of vaccine while 61,756,912 had completed the process with the second dose. In addition, 1,120,629 health professionals had taken the third dose.
- 16 October
  - 43,163,674 specimens had been tested from 28,893,860 people using RT-PCR, TCM, and antigen rapid tests. There were 490,512 suspected cases.
  - Indonesia confirmed 997 new cases, bringing the total number to 4,234,011. 1,525 patients recovered, bringing the total number to 4,072,332. 44 patients deceased, bringing the tally to 142,933. 510 municipalities and regencies had reported at least one positive case.
  - The number of active cases was 18,746, the lowest since 5 June 2020.
  - As of 18:00 WIB (UTC+7), 107,007,867 people had taken the first dose of vaccine while 62,375,794 had completed the process with the second dose. In addition, 1,067,241 health professionals had taken the third dose.
- 17 October
  - 43,387,603 specimens had been tested from 29,040,820 people using RT-PCR, TCM, and antigen rapid tests. There were 492,928 suspected cases.
  - Indonesia confirmed 747 new cases, bringing the total number to 4,234,758. 1,086 patients recovered, bringing the total number to 4,073,418. 19 patients deceased – the lowest since 16 May 2020, bringing the tally to 142,952. 510 municipalities and regencies had reported at least one positive case.
  - The number of active cases was 18,388, the lowest since 5 June 2020.
  - As of 18:00 WIB (UTC+7), 107,614,074 people had taken the first dose of vaccine while 62,831,275 had completed the process with the second dose. In addition, 1,073,746 health professionals had taken the third dose.
  - 2.5 million doses of the Pfizer–BioNTech vaccine arrived in Indonesia.
- 18 October
  - 43,602,816 specimens had been tested from 29,186,549 people using RT-PCR, TCM, and antigen rapid tests. There were 457,320 suspected cases.
  - Indonesia confirmed 626 new cases, bringing the total number to 4,235,384. 1,593 patients recovered, bringing the total number to 4,075,011. 47 patients deceased, bringing the tally to 142,999. 510 municipalities and regencies had reported at least one positive case.
  - The number of active cases was 17,374, the lowest since 30 May 2020.
  - The government extended the community activities restrictions enforcement until 1 November in Java and Bali and 8 November in other regions of the country.
  - As of 18:00 WIB (UTC+7), 108,434,662 people had taken the first dose of vaccine while 63,485,026 had completed the process with the second dose. In addition, 1,075,180 health professionals had taken the third dose.
- 19 October
  - 43,863,159 specimens had been tested from 29,362,005 people using RT-PCR, TCM, and antigen rapid tests. There were 6,074 suspected cases.
  - Indonesia confirmed 903 new cases, bringing the total number to 4,236,287. 1,530 patients recovered, bringing the total number to 4,076,541. 50 patients deceased, bringing the tally to 143,049. 510 municipalities and regencies had reported at least one positive case.
  - The number of active cases was 16,697, the lowest since 27 May 2020.
  - As of 18:00 WIB (UTC+7), 109,582,401 people had taken the first dose of vaccine while 64,363,106 had completed the process with the second dose. In addition, 1,080,510 health professionals had taken the third dose.
  - 224,000 doses of the Oxford-AstraZeneca vaccine arrived in Indonesia.
- 20 October
  - 44,111,272 specimens had been tested from 29,518,351 people using RT-PCR, TCM, and antigen rapid tests. There were 6,706 suspected cases.
  - Indonesia confirmed 914 new cases, bringing the total number to 4,237,201. 1,207 patients recovered, bringing the total number to 4,077,748. 28 patients deceased, bringing the tally to 143,077. 510 municipalities and regencies had reported at least one positive case.
  - The number of active cases was 16,376, the lowest since 27 May 2020.
  - As of 18:00 WIB (UTC+7), 110,023,076 people had taken the first dose of vaccine while 64,846,585 had completed the process with the second dose. In addition, 1,084,905 health professionals had taken the third dose.
  - 1.4 million doses of the Oxford-AstraZeneca vaccine arrived in Indonesia.
- 21 October
  - 44,329,671 specimens had been tested from 29,666,843 people using RT-PCR, TCM, and antigen rapid tests. There were 4,336 suspected cases.
  - Indonesia confirmed 633 new cases, bringing the total number to 4,237,834. 1,372 patients recovered, bringing the total number to 4,079,120. 43 patients deceased, bringing the tally to 143,120. 510 municipalities and regencies had reported at least one positive case.
  - The number of active cases was 15,594, the lowest since 24 May 2020.
  - As of 18:00 WIB (UTC+7), 110,929,109 people had taken the first dose of vaccine while 65,598,706 had completed the process with the second dose. In addition, 1,088,795 health professionals had taken the third dose.
  - 1.2 million doses of the Pfizer–BioNTech vaccine and 698,090 doses of the Oxford-AstraZeneca vaccine arrived in Indonesia.
- 22 October
  - 44,580,411 specimens had been tested from 29,832,090 people using RT-PCR, TCM, and antigen rapid tests. There were 6,556 suspected cases.
  - Indonesia confirmed 760 new cases, bringing the total number to 4,238,594. 1,231 patients recovered, bringing the total number to 4,080,351. 33 patients deceased, bringing the tally to 143,153. 510 municipalities and regencies had reported at least one positive case.
  - The number of active cases was 15,090, the lowest since 22 May 2020.
  - As of 18:00 WIB (UTC+7), 111,949,483 people had taken the first dose of vaccine while 66,666,136 had completed the process with the second dose. In addition, 1,096,400 health professionals had taken the third dose
  - 1.18 million doses of the Pfizer–BioNTech vaccine and 844,820 doses of the Oxford-AstraZeneca vaccine arrived in Indonesia.
- 23 October
  - 44,830,998 specimens had been tested from 29,993,954 people using RT-PCR, TCM, and antigen rapid tests. There were 6,703 suspected cases.
  - Indonesia confirmed 802 new cases, bringing the total number to 4,239,396. 1,066 patients recovered, bringing the total number to 4,081,417. 23 patients deceased, bringing the tally to 143,176. 510 municipalities and regencies had reported at least one positive case.
  - The number of active cases was 14,803, the lowest since 22 May 2020.
  - As of 18:00 WIB (UTC+7), 112,881,683 people had taken the first dose of vaccine while 67,628,278 had completed the process with the second dose. In addition, 1,101,418 health professionals had taken the third dose.
- 24 October
  - 45,045,743 specimens had been tested from 30,128,236 people using RT-PCR, TCM, and antigen rapid tests. There were 5,104 suspected cases.
  - Indonesia confirmed 623 new cases, bringing the total number to 4,240,019. 1,037 patients recovered, bringing the total number to 4,082,454. 29 patients deceased, bringing the tally to 143,205. 510 municipalities and regencies had reported at least one positive case.
  - The number of active cases was 14,360, the lowest since 21 May 2020.
  - As of 18:00 WIB (UTC+7), 113,186,074 people had taken the first dose of vaccine while 68,045,916 had completed the process with the second dose. In addition, 1,106,406 health professionals had taken the third dose.
- 25 October
  - 45,261,565 specimens had been tested from 30,265,853 people using RT-PCR, TCM, and antigen rapid tests. There were 5,104 suspected cases.
  - Indonesia confirmed 460 new cases – the lowest since 26 May 2020, bringing the total number to 4,240,479. 1,236 patients recovered, bringing the total number to 4,083,690. 30 patients deceased, bringing the tally to 143,235. 510 municipalities and regencies had reported at least one positive case.
  - The number of active cases was 13,554, the lowest since 20 May 2020.
  - The overall daily positivity rate hit 0.33%, the lowest ever.
  - As of 18:00 WIB (UTC+7), 114,024,092 people had taken the first dose of vaccine while 68,673,427 had completed the process with the second dose. In addition, 1,106,406 health professionals had taken the third dose.
  - 684,400 doses of the Oxford-AstraZeneca vaccine from New Zealand arrived in Indonesia.
  - President Joko Widodo had instructed the Ministry of Health to decrease the maximum price of PCR tests to IDR300,000. Additionally, those who travel by air had to perform a PCR test at least 72 hours before their departure.
- 26 October
  - 45,520,629 specimens had been tested from 30,443,930 people using RT-PCR, TCM, and antigen rapid tests. There were 7,061 suspected cases.
  - Indonesia confirmed 611 new cases, bringing the total number to 4,241,090. 1,141 patients recovered, bringing the total number to 4,084,831. 35 patients deceased, bringing the tally to 143,270. 510 municipalities and regencies had reported at least one positive case.
  - The number of active cases was 12,989, the lowest since 19 May 2020.
  - As of 18:00 WIB (UTC+7), 114,834,842 people had taken the first dose of vaccine while 69,455,264 had completed the process with the second dose. In addition, 1,111,930 health professionals had taken the third dose.
  - Five million doses of CoronaVac arrived in Indonesia.
- 27 October
  - 45,781,080 specimens had been tested from 30,627,749 people using RT-PCR, TCM, and antigen rapid tests. There were 7,584 suspected cases.
  - Indonesia confirmed 719 new cases, bringing the total number to 4,241,809. 944 patients recovered, bringing the total number to 4,085,775. 29 patients deceased, bringing the tally to 143,299. 510 municipalities and regencies had reported at least one positive case.
  - The number of active cases was 12,735, the lowest since 18 May 2020.
  - As of 18:00 WIB (UTC+7), 115,885,271 people had taken the first dose of vaccine while 70,413,299 had completed the process with the second dose. In addition, 1,114,791 health professionals had taken the third dose.
  - Four million doses of CoronaVac arrived in Indonesia.
- 28 October
  - 46,040,621 specimens had been tested from 30,791,978 people using RT-PCR, TCM, and antigen rapid tests. There were 7,248 suspected cases.
  - Indonesia confirmed 723 new cases, bringing the total number to 4,242,532. 984 patients recovered, bringing the total number to 4,086,759. 34 patients deceased, bringing the tally to 143,333. 510 municipalities and regencies had reported at least one positive case.
  - The number of active cases was 12,440, the lowest since 17 May 2020.
  - As of 18:00 WIB (UTC+7), 117,271,359 people had taken the first dose of vaccine while 71,506,726 had completed the process with the second dose. In addition, 1,119,489 health professionals had taken the third dose.
  - Four million doses of CoronaVac and 677,430 doses of the Pfizer–BioNTech vaccine arrived in Indonesia.
  - The Ministry of Health announced that they had capped the maximum price of PCR tests to IDR300,000 in Java and Bali and IDR275,000 in other parts of Indonesia.
- 29 October
  - 46,285,013 specimens had been tested from 30,952,719 people using RT-PCR, TCM, and antigen rapid tests. There were 7,575 suspected cases.
  - Indonesia confirmed 683 new cases, bringing the total number to 4,243,215. 681 patients recovered, bringing the total number to 4,087,440. 28 patients deceased, bringing the tally to 143,361. 510 municipalities and regencies had reported at least one positive case.
  - The number of active cases was 12,414, the lowest since 17 May 2020.
  - The number of new cases was higher than the recoveries for the first time since 4 August 2021.
  - As of 18:00 WIB (UTC+7), 118,237,761 people had taken the first dose of vaccine while 72,492,652 had completed the process with the second dose. In addition, 1,125,535 health professionals had taken the third dose.
  - Four million doses of CoronaVac, 1.26 million doses of the Pfizer–BioNTech vaccine, and 1.34 million doses of the Oxford-AstraZeneca vaccine arrived in Indonesia.
- 30 October
  - 46,524,399 specimens had been tested from 31,109,059 people using RT-PCR, TCM, and antigen rapid tests. There were 6,980 suspected cases.
  - Indonesia confirmed 620 new cases, bringing the total number to 4,243,835. 698 patients recovered, bringing the total number to 4,088,138. 27 patients deceased, bringing the tally to 143,388. 510 municipalities and regencies had reported at least one positive case.
  - The number of active cases was 12,309, the lowest since 17 May 2020.
  - As of 18:00 WIB (UTC+7), 119,242,444 people had taken the first dose of vaccine while 73,388,966 had completed the process with the second dose. In addition, 1,130,956 health professionals had taken the third dose.
  - 819,600 doses of the Moderna vaccine from the Netherlands arrived in Indonesia.
- 31 October
  - 46,726,472 specimens had been tested from 31,236,013 people using RT-PCR, TCM, and antigen rapid tests. There were 5,053 suspected cases.
  - Indonesia confirmed 523 new cases, bringing the total number to 4,244,358. 497 patients recovered, bringing the total number to 4,088,635. 17 patients deceased – the lowest since 16 May 2020, bringing the tally to 143,405. 510 municipalities and regencies had reported at least one positive case.
  - The number of active cases was higher than the previous day for the first time since 3 August 2021.
  - As of 12:00 WIB (UTC+7), 119,662,248 people had taken the first dose of vaccine while 73,698,983 had completed the process with the second dose. In addition, 1,134,177 health professionals had taken the third dose.
  - 339,300 doses of the Pfizer–BioNTech vaccine arrived in Indonesia.

== November ==
- 1 November
  - 46,930,288 specimens had been tested from 31,373,386 people using RT-PCR, TCM, and antigen rapid tests. There were 4,003 suspected cases.
  - Indonesia confirmed 403 new cases – the lowest since 11 May 2020, bringing the total number to 4,244,761. 784 patients recovered, bringing the total number to 4,089,419. 18 patients deceased, bringing the tally to 143,423. 510 municipalities and regencies had reported at least one positive case.
  - The overall daily positivity rate hit 0.29%, the lowest ever. The number of active cases was 11,919, the lowest since 15 May 2020.
  - As of 18:00 WIB (UTC+7), 120,550,917 people had taken the first dose of vaccine while 74,444,261 had completed the process with the second dose. In addition, 1,140,343 health professionals had taken the third dose.
  - Four million doses of CoronaVac arrived in Indonesia.
  - The National Agency of Drug and Food Control of Indonesia (BPOM) authorized the use of CoronaVac for kids age 6 to 11.
- 2 November
  - 47,185,852 specimens had been tested from 31,548,810 people using RT-PCR, TCM, and antigen rapid tests. There were 8,769 suspected cases.
  - Indonesia confirmed 612 new cases, bringing the total number to 4,245,373. 868 patients recovered, bringing the total number to 4,090,287. 34 patients deceased, bringing the tally to 143,457. 510 municipalities and regencies had reported at least one positive case.
  - The number of active cases was 11,629, the lowest since 15 May 2020.
  - As of 18:00 WIB (UTC+7), 121,362,783 people had taken the first dose of vaccine while 75,215,520 had completed the process with the second dose. In addition, 1,144,110 health professionals had taken the third dose.
  - The government extended the Community Activities Restrictions Enforcement until 15 November in Java and Bali.
  - Four million doses of CoronaVac and 134,560 doses of the Oxford-AstraZeneca vaccine arrived in Indonesia.
  - The National Agency of Drug and Food Control of Indonesia (BPOM) published the emergency use authorization for the Novavax vaccine, becoming the first country to do so.
  - The Ministry of Health allowed people who travel by air in Java and Bali to perform only an antigen test instead of PCR test. In addition, people who travel by land in the islands now had to perform an antigen test.
- 3 November
  - 47,438,975 specimens had been tested from 31,716,481 people using RT-PCR, TCM, and antigen rapid tests. There were 7,500 suspected cases.
  - Indonesia confirmed 801 new cases, bringing the total number to 4,246,174. 814 patients recovered, bringing the total number to 4,091,101. 24 patients deceased, bringing the tally to 143,481. 510 municipalities and regencies had reported at least one positive case.
  - The number of active cases was 11,592, the lowest since 14 May 2020.
  - As of 18:00 WIB (UTC+7), 122,461,817 people had taken the first dose of vaccine while 76,189,978 had completed the process with the second dose. In addition, 1,148,581 health professionals had taken the third dose.
- 4 November
  - 47,688,215 specimens had been tested from 31,900,688 people using RT-PCR, TCM, and antigen rapid tests. There were 7,083 suspected cases.
  - Indonesia confirmed 628 new cases, bringing the total number to 4,246,802. 837 patients recovered, bringing the total number to 4,091,938. 19 patients deceased, bringing the tally to 143,500. 510 municipalities and regencies had reported at least one positive case.
  - The number of active cases was 11,364, the lowest since 13 May 2020.
  - As of 18:00 WIB (UTC+7), 123,431,552 people had taken the first dose of vaccine while 77,112,108 had completed the process with the second dose. In addition, 1,153,030 health professionals had taken the third dose.
  - 680,100 doses of the Oxford–AstraZeneca vaccine arrived in Indonesia.
- 5 November
  - 47,904,816 specimens had been tested from 32,050,080 people using RT-PCR, TCM, and antigen rapid tests. There were 5,866 suspected cases.
  - Indonesia confirmed 518 new cases, bringing the total number to 4,247,320. 648 patients recovered, bringing the total number to 4,092,586. 19 patients deceased, bringing the tally to 143,519. 510 municipalities and regencies had reported at least one positive case.
  - The number of active cases was 11,215, the lowest since 13 May 2020.
  - As of 18:00 WIB (UTC+7), 124,085,508 people had taken the first dose of vaccine while 78,038,362 had completed the process with the second dose. In addition, 1,159,081 health professionals had taken the third dose.
  - 69,030 doses of the Pfizer–BioNTech vaccine arrived in Indonesia.
- 6 November
  - 48,160,848 specimens had been tested from 32,226,925 people using RT-PCR, TCM, and antigen rapid tests. There were 6,393 suspected cases.
  - Indonesia confirmed 401 new cases – the lowest since 11 May 2020, bringing the total number to 4,247,721. 622 patients recovered, bringing the total number to 4,093,208. 15 patients deceased – the lowest since 16 May 2020, bringing the tally to 143,534. 510 municipalities and regencies had reported at least one positive case.
  - The overall daily positivity rate hit 0.23%, the lowest ever. The number of active cases was 10,979, the lowest since 12 May 2020.
  - As of 18:00 WIB (UTC+7), 124,704,987 people had taken the first dose of vaccine while 78,038,362 had completed the process with the second dose. In addition, 1,164,567 health professionals had taken the third dose.
- 7 November
  - 48,380,805 specimens had been tested from 32,375,086 people using RT-PCR, TCM, and antigen rapid tests. There were 4,498 suspected cases.
  - Indonesia confirmed 444 new cases, bringing the total number to 4,248,165. 587 patients recovered, bringing the total number to 4,093,795. 11 patients deceased – the lowest since 5 May 2020, bringing the tally to 143,545. 510 municipalities and regencies had reported at least one positive case.
  - The number of active cases was 10,825, the lowest since 12 May 2020.
  - As of 18:00 WIB (UTC+7), 125,182,558 people had taken the first dose of vaccine while 79,046,831 had completed the process with the second dose. In addition, 1,166,537 health professionals had taken the third dose.
- 8 November
  - 48,569,402 specimens had been tested from 32,505,277 people using RT-PCR, TCM, and antigen rapid tests. There were 2,486 suspected cases.
  - Indonesia confirmed 244 new cases – the lowest since 11 May 2020, bringing the total number to 4,248,409. 1,283 patients recovered, bringing the total number to 4,095,078. 12 patients deceased – the lowest since 5 May 2020, bringing the tally to 143,557. 510 municipalities and regencies had reported at least one positive case.
  - The overall daily positivity rate hit 0.19%, the lowest ever. The number of active cases was 9,774, the lowest since 8 May 2020.
  - As of 18:00 WIB (UTC+7), 125,465,844 people had taken the first dose of vaccine while 79,339,263 had completed the process with the second dose. In addition, 1,167,457 health professionals had taken the third dose.
  - The government extended the community activities restrictions enforcement until 22 November outside Java and Bali.
  - Four million doses of CoronaVac arrived in Indonesia.
- 9 November
  - 48,817,417 specimens had been tested from 32,678,344 people using RT-PCR, TCM, and antigen rapid tests. There were 7,082 suspected cases.
  - Indonesia confirmed 434 new cases, bringing the total number to 4,248,843. 585 patients recovered, bringing the total number to 4,095,663. 21 patients deceased, bringing the tally to 143,578. 510 municipalities and regencies had reported at least one positive case.
  - The number of active cases was 9,602, the lowest since 7 May 2020.
  - As of 18:00 WIB (UTC+7), 126,891,650 people had taken the first dose of vaccine while 80,410,657 had completed the process with the second dose. In addition, 1,171,572 health professionals had taken the third dose.
  - Four million doses of CoronaVac arrived in Indonesia.
- 10 November
  - 49,117,017 specimens had been tested from 32,870,906 people using RT-PCR, TCM, and antigen rapid tests. There were 7,082 suspected cases.
  - Indonesia confirmed 480 new cases, bringing the total number to 4,249,323. 531 patients recovered, bringing the total number to 4,096,194. 14 patients deceased, bringing the tally to 143,592. 510 municipalities and regencies had reported at least one positive case.
  - The number of active cases was 9,537, the lowest since 7 May 2020.
  - As of 18:00 WIB (UTC+7), 127,802,744 people had taken the first dose of vaccine while 81,274,045 had completed the process with the second dose. In addition, 1,174,413 health professionals had taken the third dose.
  - Gorontalo became the first province to have no active cases since West Kalimantan on 22 July 2020. In total, 11,827 cases had been recorded, with 11,367 recoveries and 460 deaths.
  - 680,400 doses of the Moderna vaccine arrived in Indonesia.
- 11 November
  - 49,379,045 specimens had been tested from 33,047,840 people using RT-PCR, TCM, and antigen rapid tests. There were 6,264 suspected cases.
  - Indonesia confirmed 435 new cases, bringing the total number to 4,249,758. 470 patients recovered, bringing the total number to 4,096,664. 16 patients deceased, bringing the tally to 143,608. 510 municipalities and regencies had reported at least one positive case.
  - The number of active cases was 9,486, the lowest since 7 May 2020.
  - As of 18:00 WIB (UTC+7), 128,689,860 people had taken the first dose of vaccine while 82,121,116 had completed the process with the second dose. In addition, 1,177,163 health professionals had taken the third dose.
  - 2.29 million doses of the Pfizer–BioNTech vaccine and 1.2 million doses of the Oxford-AstraZeneca vaccine arrived in Indonesia.
- 12 November
  - 49,379,045 specimens had been tested from 33,047,840 people using RT-PCR, TCM, and antigen rapid tests. There were 6,264 suspected cases.
  - Indonesia confirmed 435 new cases, bringing the total number to 4,249,758. 470 patients recovered, bringing the total number to 4,096,664. 16 patients deceased, bringing the tally to 143,608. 510 municipalities and regencies had reported at least one positive case.
  - The number of active cases was 9,486, the lowest since 7 May 2020.
  - As of 18:00 WIB (UTC+7), 128,689,860 people had taken the first dose of vaccine while 82,121,116 had completed the process with the second dose. In addition, 1,177,163 health professionals had taken the third dose.
- 13 November
  - 49,905,837 specimens had been tested from 33,387,768 people using RT-PCR, TCM, and antigen rapid tests. There were 4,872 suspected cases.
  - Indonesia confirmed 359 new cases, bringing the total number to 4,250,516. 451 patients recovered, bringing the total number to 4,097,675. 16 patients deceased, bringing the tally to 143,644. 510 municipalities and regencies had reported at least one positive case.
  - The number of active cases was 9,197, the lowest since 5 May 2020.
  - As of 18:00 WIB (UTC+7), 130,102,343 people had taken the first dose of vaccine while 83,825,658 had completed the process with the second dose. In addition, 1,186,149 health professionals had taken the third dose.
  - Four million doses of CoronaVac arrived in Indonesia in the past two days.
- 14 November
  - 50,139,036 specimens had been tested from 33,543,069 people using RT-PCR, TCM, and antigen rapid tests. There were 4,872 suspected cases.
  - Indonesia confirmed 339 new cases, bringing the total number to 4,250,855. 503 patients recovered, bringing the total number to 4,098,178. 15 patients deceased, bringing the tally to 143,659. 510 municipalities and regencies had reported at least one positive case.
  - The number of active cases was 9,018, the lowest since 5 May 2020.
  - As of 18:00 WIB (UTC+7), 130,362,568 people had taken the first dose of vaccine while 84,188,813 had completed the process with the second dose. In addition, 1,189,308 health professionals had taken the third dose.
- 15 November
  - 50,382,458 specimens had been tested from 33,711,018 people using RT-PCR, TCM, and antigen rapid tests. There were 3,845 suspected cases.
  - Indonesia confirmed 221 new cases – the lowest since 27 April 2020, bringing the total number to 4,251,076. 706 patients recovered, bringing the total number to 4,098,884. 11 patients deceased, bringing the tally to 143,670. 510 municipalities and regencies had reported at least one positive case.
  - The overall daily positivity rate hit 0.13%, the lowest ever. The number of active cases was 8,522, the lowest since 3 May 2020.
  - As of 18:00 WIB (UTC+7), 130,947,123 people had taken the first dose of vaccine while 84,868,381 had completed the process with the second dose. In addition, 1,192,522 health professionals had taken the third dose.
  - The government extended the community activities restrictions enforcement until 29 November in Java and Bali.
- 16 November
  - 50,661,473 specimens had been tested from 33,906,599 people using RT-PCR, TCM, and antigen rapid tests. There were 6,176 suspected cases.
  - Indonesia confirmed 347 new cases, bringing the total number to 4,251,423. 515 patients recovered, bringing the total number to 4,099,399. 15 patients deceased, bringing the tally to 143,685. 510 municipalities and regencies had reported at least one positive case.
  - The number of active cases was 8,339, the lowest since 1 May 2020.
  - As of 18:00 WIB (UTC+7), 131,672,931 people had taken the first dose of vaccine while 85,759,717 had completed the process with the second dose. In addition, 1,195,886 health professionals had taken the third dose.
- 17 November
  - 50,940,689 specimens had been tested from 34,100,429 people using RT-PCR, TCM, and antigen rapid tests. There were 7,177 suspected cases.
  - Indonesia confirmed 522 new cases, bringing the total number to 4,251,945. 458 patients recovered, bringing the total number to 4,099,857. 13 patients deceased, bringing the tally to 143,698. 510 municipalities and regencies had reported at least one positive case.
  - The number of active cases increased by 51, the highest since 3 August 2021.
  - As of 18:00 WIB (UTC+7), 132,062,889 people had taken the first dose of vaccine while 86,316,426 had completed the process with the second dose. In addition, 1,197,771 health professionals had taken the third dose.
  - 1.2 million doses of the Oxford-AstraZeneca vaccine from Australia arrived in Indonesia.
- 18 November
  - 51,210,917 specimens had been tested from 34,289,357 people using RT-PCR, TCM, and antigen rapid tests. There were 5,465 suspected cases.
  - Indonesia confirmed 400 new cases, bringing the total number to 4,252,345. 464 patients recovered, bringing the total number to 4,100,321. 11 patients deceased, bringing the tally to 143,709. 510 municipalities and regencies had reported at least one positive case.
  - The number of active cases was 8,339, the lowest since 1 May 2020.
  - As of 18:00 WIB (UTC+7), 132,297,316 people had taken the first dose of vaccine while 86,508,426 had completed the process with the second dose. In addition, 1,198,658 health professionals had taken the third dose.
  - The European Union lifted travel ban and allowed Indonesians to enter their countries.
- 19 November
  - 51,483,621 specimens had been tested from 34,473,154 people using RT-PCR, TCM, and antigen rapid tests. There were 5,669 suspected cases.
  - Indonesia confirmed 360 new cases, bringing the total number to 4,252,705. 516 patients recovered, bringing the total number to 4,100,837. 5 patients deceased – the lowest since 25 March 2020, bringing the tally to 143,714. 510 municipalities and regencies had reported at least one positive case.
  - The number of active cases was 8,154, the lowest since 30 April 2020.
  - As of 18:00 WIB (UTC+7), 133,716,491 people had taken the first dose of vaccine while 88,282,535 had completed the process with the second dose. In addition, 1,203,606 health professionals had taken the third dose.
  - 4.059 million doses of the Oxford-AstraZeneca vaccine and 800,000 doses of the Moderna vaccine arrived in Indonesia.
- 20 November
  - 51,758,593 specimens had been tested from 34,659,385 people using RT-PCR, TCM, and antigen rapid tests. There were 4,982 suspected cases.
  - Indonesia confirmed 393 new cases, bringing the total number to 4,253,098. 379 patients recovered, bringing the total number to 4,101,216. 14 patients deceased, bringing the tally to 143,728. 510 municipalities and regencies had reported at least one positive case.
  - There was no change in the number of active cases for the first time since 7 March 2020, stopping the record of consecutive decreasing daily active cases that occurred since 4 August 2021 (107 days up to 19 November).
  - As of 18:00 WIB (UTC+7), 134,096,306 people had taken the first dose of vaccine while 88,824,134 had completed the process with the second dose. In addition, 1,203,853 health professionals had taken the third dose.
  - 2.6 million doses of the Pfizer–BioNTech vaccine arrived in Indonesia.
  - The Indonesian round of the 2021 Superbike World Championship was held in Mandalika International Street Circuit in West Nusa Tenggara, becoming the first international sporting event held in Indonesia after the pandemic started.
- 21 November
  - 51,997,773 specimens had been tested from 34,813,201 people using RT-PCR, TCM, and antigen rapid tests. There were 3,602 suspected cases.
  - Indonesia confirmed 314 new cases, bringing the total number to 4,253,412. 331 patients recovered, bringing the total number to 4,101,547. 11 patients deceased, bringing the tally to 143,739. 510 municipalities and regencies had reported at least one positive case.
  - The number of active cases was 8,126, the lowest since 30 April 2020.
  - As of 18:00 WIB (UTC+7), 134,459,785 people had taken the first dose of vaccine while 89,271,244 had completed the process with the second dose. Oddly, there were 1,203,845 health professionals who had taken the third dose, eight less than the previous day.
  - 2.26 million doses of the Pfizer–BioNTech vaccine arrived in Indonesia.
- 22 November
  - 52,249,638 specimens had been tested from 34,979,886 people using RT-PCR, TCM, and antigen rapid tests. There were 3,523 suspected cases.
  - Indonesia confirmed 186 new cases – the lowest since 4 April 2020, bringing the total number to 4,253,598. 342 patients recovered, bringing the total number to 4,101,889. 5 patients deceased – the joint-lowest since 25 March 2020, bringing the tally to 143,744. 510 municipalities and regencies had reported at least one positive case.
  - The overall daily positivity rate hit 0.11%, the lowest ever. The number of active cases was 7,965, the lowest since 30 April 2020.
  - As of 18:00 WIB (UTC+7), 135,085,497 people had taken the first dose of vaccine while 89,890,348 had completed the process with the second dose. In addition, 1,211,472 health professionals had taken the third dose.
  - The government extended the community activities restrictions enforcement until 6 December outside Java and Bali.
  - 866,970 doses of the Pfizer–BioNTech vaccine arrived in Indonesia.
- 23 November
  - 52,531,079 specimens had been tested from 35,173,806 people using RT-PCR, TCM, and antigen rapid tests. There were 5,908 suspected cases.
  - Indonesia confirmed 394 new cases, bringing the total number to 4,253,992. 434 patients recovered, bringing the total number to 4,102,323. 9 patients deceased, bringing the tally to 143,753. 510 municipalities and regencies had reported at least one positive case.
  - The number of active cases was 7,916, the lowest since 30 April 2020.
  - As of 18:00 WIB (UTC+7), 135,713,608 people had taken the first dose of vaccine while 90,518,386 had completed the process with the second dose. In addition, 1,214,887 health professionals had taken the third dose.
- 24 November
  - 52,819,945 specimens had been tested from 35,374,218 people using RT-PCR, TCM, and antigen rapid tests. There were 5,834 suspected cases.
  - Indonesia confirmed 451 new cases, bringing the total number to 4,254,443. 377 patients recovered, bringing the total number to 4,102,700. 13 patients deceased, bringing the tally to 143,766. 510 municipalities and regencies had reported at least one positive case.
  - The number of active cases increased by 61, the highest since 3 August 2021.
  - As of 18:00 WIB (UTC+7), 136,445,196 people had taken the first dose of vaccine while 91,615,310 had completed the process with the second dose. In addition, 1,218,369 health professionals had taken the third dose.
  - 4.3 million doses of the Oxford-AstraZeneca vaccine arrived in Indonesia.
- 25 November
  - 53,105,367 specimens had been tested from 35,573,977 people using RT-PCR, TCM, and antigen rapid tests. There were 6,070 suspected cases.
  - Indonesia confirmed 372 new cases, bringing the total number to 4,254,815. 293 patients recovered, bringing the total number to 4,102,993. 16 patients deceased, bringing the tally to 143,782. 510 municipalities and regencies had reported at least one positive case.
  - The number of active cases increased by 63, the highest since 3 August 2021. This was also the first time since 24 July 2021 that the number of active cases increased for two days in a row.
  - As of 18:00 WIB (UTC+7), 137,096,245 people had taken the first dose of vaccine while 92,717,865 had completed the process with the second dose. In addition, 1,221,660 health professionals had taken the third dose.
- 26 November
  - 53,393,987 specimens had been tested from 35,761,270 people using RT-PCR, TCM, and antigen rapid tests. There were 6,212 suspected cases.
  - Indonesia confirmed 453 new cases, bringing the total number to 4,255,268. 386 patients recovered, bringing the total number to 4,103,379. 14 patients deceased, bringing the tally to 143,796. 510 municipalities and regencies had reported at least one positive case.
  - The number of active cases increased by 53, the first time since 24 July 2021 that the number of active cases increased for three days in a row.
  - As of 18:00 WIB (UTC+7), 137,677,190 people had taken the first dose of vaccine while 93,310,541 had completed the process with the second dose. In addition, 1,224,077 health professionals had taken the third dose.
  - 706,680 doses of the Pfizer–BioNTech vaccine and 1.065 million doses of the Oxford-AstraZeneca vaccine arrived in Indonesia.
- 27 November
  - 53,681,387 specimens had been tested from 35,954,189 people using RT-PCR, TCM, and antigen rapid tests. There were 5,397 suspected cases.
  - Indonesia confirmed 404 new cases, bringing the total number to 4,255,672. 260 patients recovered, bringing the total number to 4,103,639. 11 patients deceased, bringing the tally to 143,807. 510 municipalities and regencies had reported at least one positive case.
  - The number of active cases increased by 133, the highest since 3 August 2021. It was the first time since 20 July 2021 that the number of active cases increased for four days in a row.
  - As of 18:00 WIB (UTC+7), 138,200,801 people had taken the first dose of vaccine while 93,767,088 had completed the process with the second dose. Oddly, there were 1,224,055 health professionals who had taken the third dose, 22 less than the previous day.
  - 2.707 million doses of the Oxford-AstraZeneca vaccine, 727,740 doses of the Pfizer–BioNTech vaccine, and 134,500 doses of the Novavax vaccine arrived in Indonesia.
- 28 November
  - 53,926,386 specimens had been tested from 36,109,585 people using RT-PCR, TCM, and antigen rapid tests. There were 3,983 suspected cases.
  - Indonesia confirmed 264 new cases, bringing the total number to 4,255,936. 275 patients recovered, bringing the total number to 4,103,914. 1 patient deceased – the lowest since 23 March 2020, bringing the tally to 143,808. 510 municipalities and regencies had reported at least one positive case.
  - As of 18:00 WIB (UTC+7), 138,601,858 people had taken the first dose of vaccine while 94,462,898 had completed the process with the second dose. In addition, there were 1,225,365 health professionals who had taken the third dose.
  - 334,620 doses of the Pfizer–BioNTech vaccine and 705,600 doses of the Oxford–AstraZeneca vaccine arrived in Indonesia.
- 29 November
  - 54,160,249 specimens had been tested from 36,285,966 people using RT-PCR, TCM, and antigen rapid tests. There were 3,272 suspected cases.
  - Indonesia confirmed 176 new cases – the lowest since 4 April 2020, bringing the total number to 4,256,112. 419 patients recovered, bringing the total number to 4,104,333. 11 patients deceased, bringing the tally to 143,819. 510 municipalities and regencies had reported at least one positive case.
  - As of 18:00 WIB (UTC+7), 139,117,546 people had taken the first dose of vaccine while 95,069,519 had completed the process with the second dose. Oddly, there were 1,223,472 health professionals who had taken the third dose, 1,893 less than the previous day.
  - The overall daily positivity rate hit 0.1%, the lowest ever.
  - Four million doses of CoronaVac arrived in Indonesia.
  - The government extended the community activities restrictions enforcement until 13 December in Java and Bali.
  - Indonesia banned all foreign citizens who had visited South Africa, Botswana, Namibia, Zimbabwe, Lesotho, Mozambique, Eswatini, Malawi, Angola, Zambia, and Hong Kong in the past 14 days from entering the country amid the emergence of the new Omicron variant.
- 30 November
  - 54,454,474 specimens had been tested from 36,486,865 people using RT-PCR, TCM, and antigen rapid tests. There were 4,608 suspected cases.
  - Indonesia confirmed 297 new cases, bringing the total number to 4,256,409. 324 patients recovered, bringing the total number to 4,104,657. 11 patients deceased, bringing the tally to 143,830. 510 municipalities and regencies had reported at least one positive case.
  - As of 18:00 WIB (UTC+7), 139,371,977 people had taken the first dose of vaccine while 95,481,241 had completed the process with the second dose. Oddly, there were 1,222,697 health professionals who had taken the third dose, 775 less than the previous day.
  - Four million doses of CoronaVac and 1.7 million doses of the Oxford–AstraZeneca vaccine arrived in Indonesia.

== December ==
- 1 December
  - 54,746,617 specimens had been tested from 36,686,240 people using RT-PCR, TCM, and antigen rapid tests. There were 5,299 suspected cases.
  - Indonesia confirmed 278 new cases, bringing the total number to 4,256,687. 307 patients recovered, bringing the total number to 4,104,964. 10 patients deceased, bringing the tally to 143,840. 510 municipalities and regencies had reported at least one positive case.
  - The number of active cases were 7,883, the lowest since 30 April 2020.
  - As of 18:00 WIB (UTC+7), 140,530,248 people had taken the first dose of vaccine while 96,852,719 had completed the process with the second dose. Oddly, there were 1,222,452 health professionals who had taken the third dose, 245 less than the previous day.
  - 3.6 million doses of CoronaVac and 9.1 million doses of the Oxford–AstraZeneca vaccine arrived in Indonesia.
- 2 December
  - 55,038,077 specimens had been tested from 36,885,898 people using RT-PCR, TCM, and antigen rapid tests. There were 5,253 suspected cases.
  - Indonesia confirmed 311 new cases, bringing the total number to 4,256,998. 388 patients recovered, bringing the total number to 4,105,352. 10 patients deceased, bringing the tally to 143,850. 510 municipalities and regencies had reported at least one positive case.
  - The number of active cases was 7,796, the lowest since 29 April 2020.
  - As of 18:00 WIB (UTC+7), 141,195,990 people had taken the first dose of vaccine while 97,628,085 had completed the process with the second dose. Oddly, there were 1,240,350 health professionals who had taken the third dose, 17,898 less than the previous day.
  - 191,880 doses of the Pfizer–BioNTech, 656,000 doses of the Oxford–AstraZeneca, and 4.865 million doses of the Novavax vaccines arrived in Indonesia.
- 3 December
  - 55,321,140 specimens had been tested from 37,079,997 people using RT-PCR, TCM, and antigen rapid tests. There were 5,445 suspected cases.
  - Indonesia confirmed 245 new cases, bringing the total number to 4,257,243. 328 patients recovered, bringing the total number to 4,105,680. 8 patients deceased, bringing the tally to 143,858. 510 municipalities and regencies had reported at least one positive case.
  - The number of active cases was 7,705, the lowest since 29 April 2020.
  - As of 18:00 WIB (UTC+7), 141,732,602 people had taken the first dose of vaccine while 98,275,493 had completed the process with the second dose. In addition, there were 1,242,219 health professionals who had taken the third dose.
  - 324,000 doses of the Janssen vaccine arrived in Indonesia.
- 4 December
  - 55,613,822 specimens had been tested from 37,276,383 people using RT-PCR, TCM, and antigen rapid tests. There were 5,268 suspected cases.
  - Indonesia confirmed 246 new cases, bringing the total number to 4,257,489. 314 patients recovered, bringing the total number to 4,105,994. 5 patients deceased, bringing the tally to 143,863. 510 municipalities and regencies had reported at least one positive case.
  - The number of active cases was 7,632, the lowest since 29 April 2020.
  - As of 18:00 WIB (UTC+7), 142,313,130 people had taken the first dose of vaccine while 98,912,583 had completed the process with the second dose. In addition, there were 1,245,116 health professionals who had taken the third dose.
- 5 December
  - 55,863,036 specimens had been tested from 37,434,992 people using RT-PCR, TCM, and antigen rapid tests. There were 3,565 suspected cases.
  - Indonesia confirmed 196 new cases, bringing the total number to 4,257,685. 298 patients recovered, bringing the total number to 4,106,292. 4 patients deceased, bringing the tally to 143,867. 510 municipalities and regencies had reported at least one positive case.
  - The number of active cases was 7,526, the lowest since 28 April 2020.
  - As of 18:00 WIB (UTC+7), 142,499,690 people had taken the first dose of vaccine while 99,019,466 had completed the process with the second dose. Oddly, there were 1,245,099 health professionals who had taken the third dose, 17 less than the previous day.
  - 1.9 million doses of the Oxford–AstraZeneca vaccine arrived in Indonesia.
- 6 December
  - 56,152,356 specimens had been tested from 37,635,452 people using RT-PCR, TCM, and antigen rapid tests. There were 4,054 suspected cases.
  - Indonesia confirmed 130 new cases – the lowest since 4 April 2020, bringing the total number to 4,257,815. 2,005 patients recovered – the most since 13 October 2021, bringing the total number to 4,108,297. 9 patients deceased, bringing the tally to 143,876. 510 municipalities and regencies had reported at least one positive case.
  - The overall daily positivity rate hit 0.06%, the lowest ever. The number of active cases was 5,642, the lowest since 20 April 2020. The decrease of 1,884 cases was the highest since 11 October 2021.
  - As of 18:00 WIB (UTC+7), 142,771,169 people had taken the first dose of vaccine while 99,279,136 had completed the process with the second dose. In addition, there were 1,247,399 health professionals who had taken the third dose.
  - The government extended the community activities restrictions enforcement until 23 December outside Java and Bali.
- 7 December
  - 56,528,234 specimens had been tested from 37,916,484 people using RT-PCR, TCM, and antigen rapid tests. There were 6,116 suspected cases.
  - Indonesia confirmed 261 new cases, bringing the total number to 4,258,076. 420 patients recovered, bringing the total number to 4,108,717. 17 patients deceased, bringing the tally to 143,893. 510 municipalities and regencies had reported at least one positive case.
  - The number of active cases was 5,466, the lowest since 20 April 2020.
  - As of 18:00 WIB (UTC+7), 143,486,656 people had taken the first dose of vaccine while 100,031,962 had completed the process with the second dose. In addition, there were 1,248,855 health professionals who had taken the third dose.
  - 1.5 million doses of the Moderna vaccine arrived in Indonesia.
  - At least 100 million Indonesians had been fully vaccinated.
- 8 December
  - 56,906,431 specimens had been tested from 38,199,469 people using RT-PCR, TCM, and antigen rapid tests. There were 5,861 suspected cases.
  - Indonesia confirmed 264 new cases, bringing the total number to 4,258,340. 351 patients recovered, bringing the total number to 4,109,068. 16 patients deceased, bringing the tally to 143,909. 510 municipalities and regencies had reported at least one positive case.
  - The number of active cases was 5,363, the lowest since 19 April 2020.
  - As of 18:00 WIB (UTC+7), 144,174,561 people had taken the first dose of vaccine while 100,800,869 had completed the process with the second dose. In addition, there were 1,250,486 health professionals who had taken the third dose.
  - 767,520 doses of the Pfizer–BioNTech vaccine and four million doses of the Novavax vaccine arrived in Indonesia.
- 9 December
  - 57,266,941 specimens had been tested from 38,466,588 people using RT-PCR, TCM, and antigen rapid tests. There were 5,203 suspected cases.
  - Indonesia confirmed 220 new cases, bringing the total number to 4,258,560. 296 patients recovered, bringing the total number to 4,109,364. 9 patients deceased, bringing the tally to 143,918. 510 municipalities and regencies had reported at least one positive case.
  - The number of active cases was 5,278, the lowest since 18 April 2020.
  - As of 18:00 WIB (UTC+7), 144,663,206 people had taken the first dose of vaccine while 101,433,737 had completed the process with the second dose. Oddly, there were 1,250,439 health professionals who had taken the third dose, 47 less than the previous day.
  - 336,960 doses of the Pfizer–BioNTech vaccine and 1.18 million doses of the Oxford–AstraZeneca vaccine arrived in Indonesia.
- 10 December
  - 57,596,611 specimens had been tested from 38,695,313 people using RT-PCR, TCM, and antigen rapid tests. There were 3,986 suspected cases.
  - Indonesia confirmed 192 new cases, bringing the total number to 4,258,752. 311 patients recovered, bringing the total number to 4,109,675. 5 patients deceased, bringing the tally to 143,923. 510 municipalities and regencies had reported at least one positive case.
  - The number of active cases was 5,154, the lowest since 18 April 2020.
  - As of 18:00 WIB (UTC+7), 145,457,646 people had taken the first dose of vaccine while 102,141,808 had completed the process with the second dose. In addition, there were 1,257,194 health professionals who had taken the third dose.
  - 1.21 million doses of the Pfizer–BioNTech vaccine arrived in Indonesia.
- 11 December
  - 57,900,609 specimens had been tested from 38,900,760 people using RT-PCR, TCM, and antigen rapid tests. There were 5,114 suspected cases.
  - Indonesia confirmed 228 new cases, bringing the total number to 4,258,980. 190 patients recovered, bringing the total number to 4,109,865. 6 patients deceased, bringing the tally to 143,929. 510 municipalities and regencies had reported at least one positive case.
  - The number of active cases increased to 5,186, the first since 27 November 2021.
  - As of 18:00 WIB (UTC+7), 146,266,556 people had taken the first dose of vaccine while 102,757,632 had completed the process with the second dose. Oddly, there were 1,257,148 health professionals who had taken the third dose, 46 less than the previous day.
  - 2.04 million doses of the Pfizer–BioNTech vaccine and 1.75 million doses of the Oxford–AstraZeneca vaccine arrived in Indonesia.
- 12 December
  - 58,162,340 specimens had been tested from 39,069,207 people using RT-PCR, TCM, and antigen rapid tests. There were 3,283 suspected cases.
  - Indonesia confirmed 163 new cases, bringing the total number to 4,259,143. 184 patients recovered, bringing the total number to 4,110,049. 7 patients deceased, bringing the tally to 143,936. 510 municipalities and regencies had reported at least one positive case.
  - As of 18:00 WIB (UTC+7), 146,575,803 people had taken the first dose of vaccine while 102,914,491 had completed the process with the second dose. Oddly, there were 1,257,132 health professionals who had taken the third dose, 16 less than the previous day.
  - 1.77 million doses of the Pfizer–BioNTech vaccine arrived in Indonesia.
- 13 December
  - 58,431,254 specimens had been tested from 39,246,966 people using RT-PCR, TCM, and antigen rapid tests. There were 2,118 suspected cases.
  - Indonesia confirmed 106 new cases – the joint-lowest since 4 April 2020, bringing the total number to 4,259,249. 278 patients recovered, bringing the total number to 4,110,327. 12 patients deceased, bringing the tally to 143,948. 510 municipalities and regencies had reported at least one positive case.
  - The number of active cases was 4,974, the lowest since 17 April 2020.
  - The overall daily positivity rate hit 0.06%, the joint-lowest ever.
  - As of 18:00 WIB (UTC+7), 147,039,609 people had taken the first dose of vaccine while 103,132,502 had completed the process with the second dose. In addition, there were 1,260,457 health professionals who had taken the third dose.
  - The government extended the community activities restrictions enforcement until 3 January 2022 in Java and Bali.
  - 3.53 million doses of the Pfizer–BioNTech vaccine arrived in Indonesia.
  - The Ministry of Health announced the commencement of vaccination for ages 6 to 11.
- 14 December
  - 58,730,148 specimens had been tested from 39,450,858 people using RT-PCR, TCM, and antigen rapid tests. There were 4,417 suspected cases.
  - Indonesia confirmed 190 new cases, bringing the total number to 4,259,439. 247 patients recovered, bringing the total number to 4,110,574. 12 patients deceased, bringing the tally to 143,960. 510 municipalities and regencies had reported at least one positive case.
  - The number of active cases was 4,905, the lowest since 17 April 2020.
  - As of 18:00 WIB (UTC+7), 147,906,114 people had taken the first dose of vaccine while 104,083,486 had completed the process with the second dose. In addition, there were 1,261,779 health professionals who had taken the third dose.
  - 1.76 million doses of the Pfizer–BioNTech vaccine arrived in Indonesia.
- 15 December
  - 59,039,281 specimens had been tested from 39,664,716 people using RT-PCR, TCM, and antigen rapid tests. There were 4,198 suspected cases.
  - Indonesia confirmed 205 new cases, bringing the total number to 4,259,644. 237 patients recovered, bringing the total number to 4,110,811. 9 patients deceased, bringing the tally to 143,969. 510 municipalities and regencies had reported at least one positive case.
  - The number of active cases was 4,864, the lowest since 17 April 2020.
  - As of 18:00 WIB (UTC+7), 148,537,112 people had taken the first dose of vaccine while 104,790,276 had completed the process with the second dose. In addition, there were 1,263,833 health professionals who had taken the third dose.
  - 1.095 million doses of the Oxford–AstraZeneca vaccine and 1.144 million doses of the Pfizer–BioNTech vaccine arrived in Indonesia.
- 16 December
  - 59,343,891 specimens had been tested from 39,875,827 people using RT-PCR, TCM, and antigen rapid tests. There were 4,675 suspected cases.
  - Indonesia confirmed 213 new cases, bringing the total number to 4,259,857. 234 patients recovered, bringing the total number to 4,111,045. 9 patients deceased, bringing the tally to 143,979. 510 municipalities and regencies had reported at least one positive case.
  - The number of active cases was 4,833, the lowest since 17 April 2020.
  - As of 18:00 WIB (UTC+7), 149,390,179 people had taken the first dose of vaccine while 105,555,377 had completed the process with the second dose. In addition, there were 1,266,557 health professionals who had taken the third dose.
  - Health Minister Budi Gunadi Sadikin confirmed first case of the Omicron variant in Indonesia via a press conference.
  - 1.144 million doses of the Pfizer–BioNTech vaccine arrived in Indonesia.
- 17 December
  - 59,652,804 specimens had been tested from 40,090,094 people using RT-PCR, TCM, and antigen rapid tests. There were 4,930 suspected cases.
  - Indonesia confirmed 291 new cases, bringing the total number to 4,260,148. 205 patients recovered, bringing the total number to 4,111,250. 7 patients deceased, bringing the tally to 143,986. 510 municipalities and regencies had reported at least one positive case.
  - The number of active cases increased to 4,912, the first since 11 December 2021.
  - As of 18:00 WIB (UTC+7), 150,335,166 people had taken the first dose of vaccine while 106,336,698 had completed the process with the second dose. In addition, there were 1,268,695 health professionals who had taken the third dose.
- 18 December
  - 59,964,823 specimens had been tested from 40,306,499 people using RT-PCR, TCM, and antigen rapid tests. There were 4,703 suspected cases.
  - Indonesia confirmed 232 new cases, bringing the total number to 4,260,380. 214 patients recovered, bringing the total number to 4,111,464. 12 patients deceased, bringing the tally to 143,998. 510 municipalities and regencies had reported at least one positive case.
  - As of 18:00 WIB (UTC+7), 151,047,495 people had taken the first dose of vaccine while 106,867,168 had completed the process with the second dose. Oddly, there were 1,268,664 health professionals who had taken the third dose, 31 less than the previous day.
  - The Ministry of Health confirmed two new cases of the Omicron variant, bringing the total to three.
- 19 December
  - 60,204,039 specimens had been tested from 40,427,960 people using RT-PCR, TCM, and antigen rapid tests. There were 3,600 suspected cases.
  - Indonesia confirmed 164 new cases, bringing the total number to 4,260,544. 155 patients recovered, bringing the total number to 4,111,619. 4 patients deceased, bringing the tally to 144,002. 510 municipalities and regencies had reported at least one positive case.
  - As of 18:00 WIB (UTC+7), 151,603,553 people had taken the first dose of vaccine while 107,074,957 had completed the process with the second dose. Oddly, there were 1,268,648 health professionals who had taken the third dose, 16 less than the previous day.
- 20 December
  - 60,470,151 specimens had been tested from 40,569,980 people using RT-PCR, TCM, and antigen rapid tests. There were 2,542 suspected cases.
  - Indonesia confirmed 133 new cases, bringing the total number to 4,260,677. 216 patients recovered, bringing the total number to 4,111,835. 11 patients deceased, bringing the tally to 144,013. 510 municipalities and regencies had reported at least one positive case.
  - The number of active cases was 4,829, the lowest since 17 April 2020.
  - As of 18:00 WIB (UTC+7), 152,113,355 people had taken the first dose of vaccine while 107,304,643 had completed the process with the second dose. In addition, there were 1,272,478 health professionals who had taken the third dose.
  - 482,000 doses of the Oxford–AstraZeneca vaccine arrived in Indonesia.
- 21 December
  - 60,784,337 specimens had been tested from 40,792,526 people using RT-PCR, TCM, and antigen rapid tests. There were 4,899 suspected cases.
  - Indonesia confirmed 216 new cases, bringing the total number to 4,260,893. 205 patients recovered, bringing the total number to 4,112,040. 11 patients deceased, bringing the tally to 144,024. 510 municipalities and regencies had reported at least one positive case.
  - The number of active cases was 4,829, the joint-lowest since 17 April 2020.
  - As of 18:00 WIB (UTC+7), 152,871,463 people had taken the first dose of vaccine while 107,884,725 had completed the process with the second dose. In addition, there were 1,273,763 health professionals who had taken the third dose.
  - Two million doses of CoronaVac arrived in Indonesia.
  - A man in Pinrang, South Sulawesi went viral on the Internet after he claimed that he had been vaccinated 17 times on behalf of other people.
- 22 December
  - 61,083,259 specimens had been tested from 41,007,921 people using RT-PCR, TCM, and antigen rapid tests. There were 5,231 suspected cases.
  - Indonesia confirmed 179 new cases, bringing the total number to 4,261,072. 252 patients recovered, bringing the total number to 4,112,292. 10 patients deceased, bringing the tally to 144,034. 510 municipalities and regencies had reported at least one positive case.
  - The number of active cases was 4,746, the lowest since 16 April 2020.
  - As of 18:00 WIB (UTC+7), 153,867,880 people had taken the first dose of vaccine while 108,824,929 had completed the process with the second dose. In addition, there were 1,276,343 health professionals who had taken the third dose.
  - The Ministry of Health confirmed two new cases of the Omicron variant, bringing the total to five.
- 23 December
  - 61,372,344 specimens had been tested from 41,215,358 people using RT-PCR, TCM, and antigen rapid tests. There were 4,575 suspected cases.
  - Indonesia confirmed 136 new cases, bringing the total number to 4,261,208. 232 patients recovered, bringing the total number to 4,112,524. 8 patients deceased, bringing the tally to 144,042. 510 municipalities and regencies had reported at least one positive case.
  - The number of active cases was 4,642, the joint-lowest since 16 April 2020.
  - As of 18:00 WIB (UTC+7), 154,787,005 people had taken the first dose of vaccine while 109,532,552 had completed the process with the second dose. In addition, there were 1,278,559 health professionals who had taken the third dose.
  - 1.5 million doses of the Moderna vaccine arrived in Indonesia.
  - The Ministry of Health confirmed three new cases of the Omicron variant, bringing the total to eight.
- 24 December
  - 61,632,313 specimens had been tested from 41,399,910 people using RT-PCR, TCM, and antigen rapid tests. There were 4,780 suspected cases.
  - Indonesia confirmed 204 new cases, bringing the total number to 4,261,412. 182 patients recovered, bringing the total number to 4,112,706. 5 patients deceased, bringing the tally to 144,047. 510 municipalities and regencies had reported at least one positive case.
  - As of 18:00 WIB (UTC+7), 155,767,611 people had taken the first dose of vaccine while 110,229,127 had completed the process with the second dose. In addition, there were 1,280,638 health professionals who had taken the third dose.
  - The government extended the community activities restrictions enforcement until 3 January 2022 outside Java and Bali.
  - 2.688 million doses of the Moderna vaccine and 342,810 doses of the Pfizer–BioNTech vaccine arrived in Indonesia.
  - The Ministry of Health confirmed 11 new cases of the Omicron variant, bringing the total to 19. Six of them were imported cases from Turkey.
- 25 December
  - 61,840,900 specimens had been tested from 41,549,195 people using RT-PCR, TCM, and antigen rapid tests. There were 3,856 suspected cases.
  - Indonesia confirmed 255 new cases, bringing the total number to 4,261,667. 195 patients recovered, bringing the total number to 4,112,901. 6 patients deceased, bringing the tally to 144,053. 510 municipalities and regencies had reported at least one positive case.
  - As of 18:00 WIB (UTC+7), 156,437,368 people had taken the first dose of vaccine while 110,513,053 had completed the process with the second dose. Oddly, there were 1,280,605 health professionals who had taken the third dose, 33 less than the previous day.
  - 922,800 doses of the Moderna vaccine and 1.47 million doses of the Pfizer–BioNTech vaccine arrived in Indonesia.
- 26 December
  - 62,015,718 specimens had been tested from 41,668,987 people using RT-PCR, TCM, and antigen rapid tests. There were 1,746 suspected cases.
  - Indonesia confirmed 92 new cases – the lowest since 23 March 2020, bringing the total number to 4,261,759. 148 patients recovered, bringing the total number to 4,113,049. 2 patients deceased, bringing the tally to 144,055. 510 municipalities and regencies had reported at least one positive case.
  - As of 18:00 WIB (UTC+7), 156,847,088 people had taken the first dose of vaccine while 110,661,433 had completed the process with the second dose. Oddly, there were 1,280,555 health professionals who had taken the third dose, 50 less than the previous day.
  - 1.42 million doses of the Moderna vaccine, 4.478 million doses of the Oxford–AstraZeneca, and 3.086 million doses of the Pfizer–BioNTech vaccine arrived in Indonesia.
  - The Ministry of Health confirmed 27 new cases of the Omicron variant, bringing the total to 46.
- 27 December
  - 62,247,607 specimens had been tested from 41,832,992 people using RT-PCR, TCM, and antigen rapid tests. There were 2,696 suspected cases.
  - Indonesia confirmed 120 new cases, bringing the total number to 4,261,879. 271 patients recovered, bringing the total number to 4,113,320. 8 patients deceased, bringing the tally to 144,063. 510 municipalities and regencies had reported at least one positive case.
  - The number of active cases was 4,496, the joint-lowest since 16 April 2020.
  - As of 18:00 WIB (UTC+7), 157,242,072 people had taken the first dose of vaccine while 111,165,797 had completed the process with the second dose. In addition, there were 1,280,664 health professionals who had taken the third dose.
  - 6.683 million doses of the Oxford–AstraZeneca vaccine arrived in Indonesia.
- 28 December
  - 62,494,654 specimens had been tested from 42,009,846 people using RT-PCR, TCM, and antigen rapid tests. There were 4,700 suspected cases.
  - Indonesia confirmed 278 new cases, bringing the total number to 4,262,157. 152 patients recovered, bringing the total number to 4,113,472. 8 patients deceased, bringing the tally to 144,071. 510 municipalities and regencies had reported at least one positive case.
  - As of 18:00 WIB (UTC+7), 158,107,368 people had taken the first dose of vaccine while 111,910,929 had completed the process with the second dose. Oddly, there were 1,284,588 health professionals who had taken the third dose, 76 less than the previous day.
  - 5.787 million doses of the Oxford–AstraZeneca vaccine arrived in Indonesia.
  - The Ministry of Health confirmed one new case of the Omicron variant, bringing the total to 47. This was also the first local transmission in the country, infecting a man who had travelled from Medan to Jakarta.
- 29 December
  - 62,726,434 specimens had been tested from 42,173,457 people using RT-PCR, TCM, and antigen rapid tests. There were 4,498 suspected cases.
  - Indonesia confirmed 194 new cases, bringing the total number to 4,262,351. 270 patients recovered, bringing the total number to 4,113,742. 10 patients deceased, bringing the tally to 144,081. 510 municipalities and regencies had reported at least one positive case.
  - As of 18:00 WIB (UTC+7), 159,264,485 people had taken the first dose of vaccine while 112,591,821 had completed the process with the second dose. In addition, there were 1,286,921 health professionals who had taken the third dose.
  - 1.236 million doses of CoronaVac arrived in Indonesia.
  - The Ministry of Health confirmed 21 new cases of the Omicron variant, bringing the total to 68.
- 30 December
  - 62,956,193 specimens had been tested from 42,336,492 people using RT-PCR, TCM, and antigen rapid tests. There were 4,059 suspected cases.
  - Indonesia confirmed 189 new cases, bringing the total number to 4,262,540. 399 patients recovered – the most since 7 December 2021, bringing the total number to 4,114,141. 7 patients deceased, bringing the tally to 144,088. 510 municipalities and regencies had reported at least one positive case.
  - The number of active cases was 4,311, the lowest since 15 April 2020.
  - As of 18:00 WIB (UTC+7), 160,277,964 people had taken the first dose of vaccine while 113,266,943 had completed the process with the second dose. In addition, there were 1,288,891 health professionals who had taken the third dose.
  - 438,750 doses of the Pfizer–BioNTech vaccine arrived in Indonesia.
- 31 December
  - 63,166,543 specimens had been tested from 42,486,162 people using RT-PCR, TCM, and antigen rapid tests. There were 4,183 suspected cases.
  - Indonesia confirmed 180 new cases, bringing the total number to 4,262,720. 193 patients recovered, bringing the total number to 4,114,334. 6 patients deceased, bringing the tally to 144,094. 510 municipalities and regencies had reported at least one positive case.
  - The number of active cases was 4,292, the joint-lowest since 15 April 2020.
  - As of 18:00 WIB (UTC+7), 161,315,664 people had taken the first dose of vaccine while 113,845,631 had completed the process with the second dose. Oddly, there were 1,288,837 health professionals who had taken the third dose, 54 less than the previous day.
  - 819,000 doses of the Pfizer–BioNTech vaccine and nine million doses of CoronaVac arrived in Indonesia.
  - The Ministry of Health confirmed 68 new cases of the Omicron variant, bringing the total to 136.

== See also ==
- 2021 in Indonesia
- COVID-19 vaccination in Indonesia
- Statistics of the COVID-19 pandemic in Indonesia
