= COVID-19 vaccination in Indonesia =

Plan to immunize against COVID-19

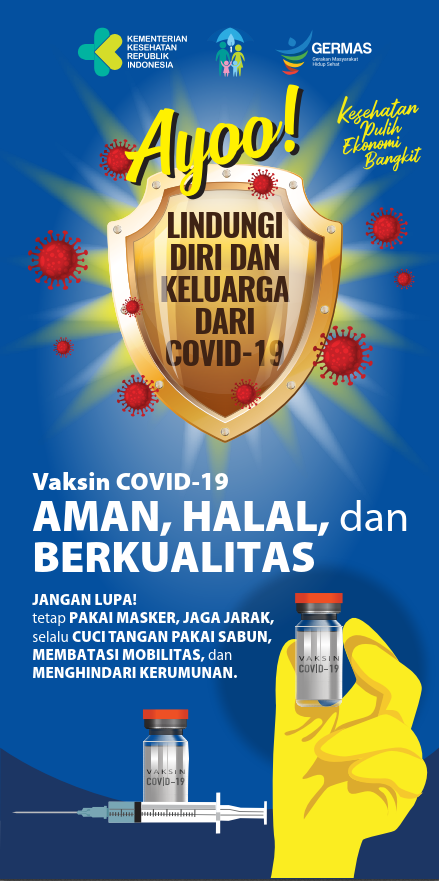
- COVID-19 vaccination campaign poster in Indonesian
- Date: 13 January 2021 – present
- Location: 34 provinces in Indonesia
- Cause: COVID-19 pandemic
- Target: 234,666,020 people
- Organised by: Ministry of Health
- Participants: First dose: 204,266,655 people; Second dose: 175,131,893 people; Third dose: 69,597,474 people; Fourth dose: 1,585,164 people
- Outcome: 75.6% of the Indonesian population has received at least one dose; 64.81% of the Indonesian population has received two doses; 25.76% of the Indonesian population has received three doses; 0.59% of the Indonesian population has received four doses
- Website: Kementerian Kesehatan

The COVID-19 vaccination in Indonesia is an ongoing mass immunization in response to the COVID-19 pandemic in Indonesia. On 13 January 2021, the program commenced when President Joko Widodo was vaccinated at the presidential palace. In terms of total doses given, Indonesia ranks third in Asia and fifth in the world.

As of 5 February 2023 at 18:00 WIB (UTC+7), 204,266,655 people had received the first dose of the vaccine and 175,131,893 people had been fully vaccinated; 69,597,474 of them had been inoculated with the booster or the third dose, while 1,585,164 had received the fourth dose. Jakarta has the highest percentage of population fully vaccinated with 103.46%, followed by Bali and Special Region of Yogyakarta with 85.45% and 83.02% respectively.

== Background ==
COVID-19 is a contagious disease caused by severe acute respiratory syndrome coronavirus 2 (SARS-CoV-2). The first known case was identified in Wuhan, Mainland China in December 2019 and was confirmed to have spread to Indonesia on 2 March 2020.

COVID-19 vaccination in Indonesia will cover more than 75% of overall Indonesian population or around 208 million people. The program is being carried out in four stages, starting from the most prioritized to the less prioritized.

- First stage focuses on health professionals which include people working in the health sector, such as doctors, surgeons, dentists, nurses, midwives, pharmacists, ambulance drivers, medical assistants, researchers, psychologists, or medical students.
- Second stage focuses on elderlies (anyone ages 60 or above) and public officers which include those who work for the public and often in contact with people, such as civil servants, state enterprise employees, police, military, teachers, retail workers, journalists, religious leaders, tourism workers, transportation workers, or athletes.
- Third stage focuses on general public which is susceptible to the economy, social, or geospatial aspect, such as those who live in dense, poor, and worst-affected areas or neighborhoods.
- Fourth stage focuses on other general public depends on the availability of the vaccines.

== Timeline ==
=== 2020 ===
On 16 December, President Jokowi announced COVID-19 vaccines would be provided for free for all Indonesians. According to Jokowi, Indonesia has procured 400 million dosage of vaccines. The vaccines would be from Sinovac, Novavax, Pfizer, and AstraZeneca.

On 31 December, Indonesia's Minister of Health said the vaccination would be mandatory. Indonesians who have received a text message from authorities have to be vaccinated. Also on this day, 1.8 million doses of CoronaVac arrived in Indonesia. Along with another 1.2 million vaccines which had arrived earlier that month, the doses would be distributed among Indonesia's 34 provinces.

=== 2021 ===
==== January ====
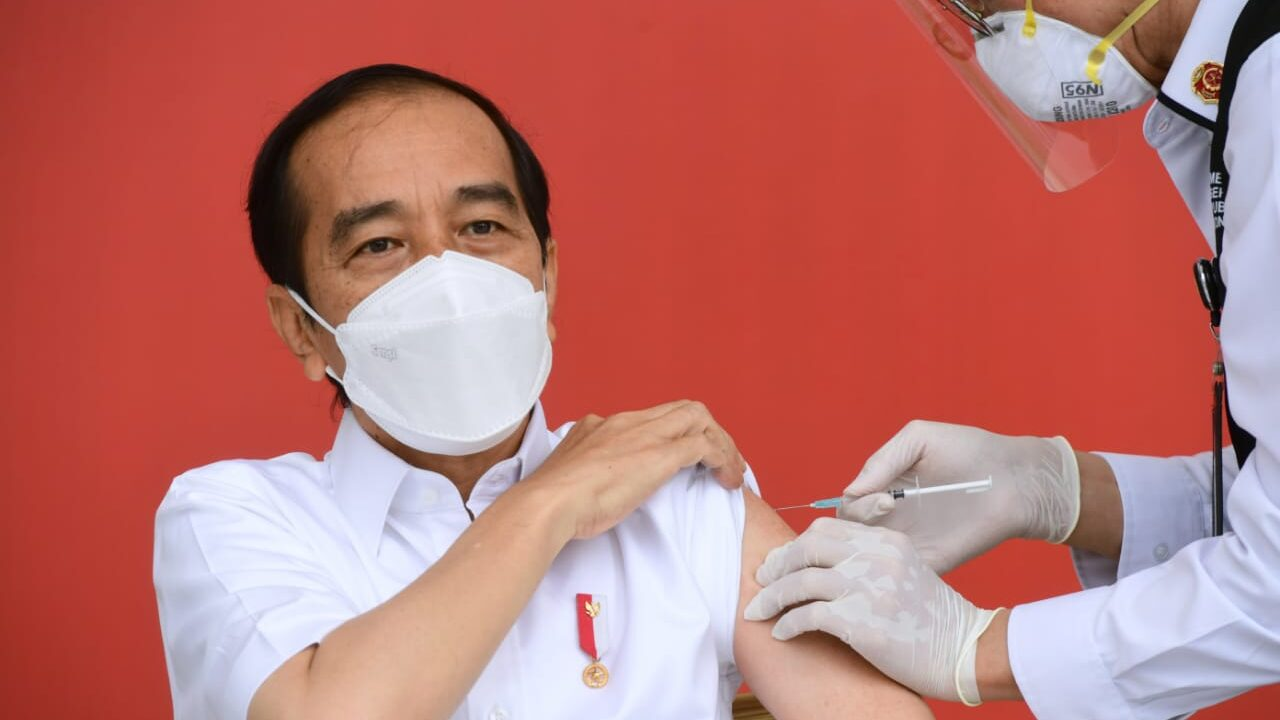
President Joko Widodo became the first person to be inoculated by COVID-19 vaccine in Indonesia.

On 8 January, Indonesian Ulema Council declared CoronaVac as halal.

On 11 January, the National Agency of Drug and Food Control (BPOM) published an emergency use authorization for CoronaVac from Sinovac Biotech for ages 18 to 59 with the second dose given 14 days after the first. At the same time, it also announced the vaccine's preliminary efficacy rate during its phase III trial of 65.3%.

On 13 January, Indonesia's vaccination program commenced.

==== February ====
On 7 February, the National Agency of Drug and Food Control (BPOM) approved the vaccination of CoronaVac for elderly people, with the second dose to be administered 28 days after the first dose instead of 14 for regular inoculation.

On 17 February, the second stage of vaccination program began. The Indonesian government confirmed vaccination would be compulsory for citizens and it would seek the private sector's help in inoculating the population.

==== March ====
On 7 March, at least 1% of Indonesia's population had received a COVID-19 vaccine inoculation.

On 8 March, Indonesia received its first shipment of vaccines from the COVAX initiative with 1.1 million doses of the Oxford–AstraZeneca vaccine.

On 15 March, the government decided on four vaccines in use for the self-vaccination program for private employees: Sinopharm BIBP, Moderna, Sputnik V, and Novavax. The country also temporarily halted the distribution of the Oxford–AstraZeneca vaccine after reports of blood clot post vaccination in Europe.

On 19 March, the National Agency of Drug and Food Control (BPOM) authorized the resumption of distribution and use of the Oxford–AstraZeneca vaccine.

On 23 March, the Ministry of Health permitted the second dose of CoronaVac for people under 60 to be administered up to 28 days after the first dose, when a strict gap of 14 days between the two doses could not be attained.

==== April ====
On 1 April, the Ministry of Health announced the postponement of the vaccination schedule for the general public to June or July because of a vaccine shortage caused by the export ban of the Oxford–AstraZeneca vaccine from India.

On 8 April, Minister of Health Budi Gunadi Sadikin said there was no certainty regarding the arrival of 104 million doses of the Oxford–AstraZeneca vaccine committed under the COVAX initiative, due to export ban from India. Moreover, the state-owned vaccine manufacturer Bio Farma announced it had ordered 15 million doses of the Sinopharm BIBP vaccine, 22 million of the Sputnik V vaccine, and 5 million of Convidecia. All would be used for the self-vaccination program.

On 18 April, Indonesia received six million bulk doses of CoronaVac, bringing the total number to 59.5 million out of 140 million doses on firm order.

On 21 April, the Ministry of Health said it would receive another 3,852,000 doses of the Oxford–AstraZeneca vaccine by early May, the second shipment to Indonesia under the COVAX initiative. It arrived on 26 April.

On 30 April, the National Agency of Drug and Food Control (BPOM) issued an Emergency Use Authorization (EUA) for the Sinopharm BIBP vaccine.

==== May ====
On 1 May, 500,000 doses of the Sinopharm BIBP vaccine donated by the United Arab Emirates government arrived, the first shipment of the vaccine received by Indonesia.

On 5 May, Jakarta expanded its vaccination program to include the general public at its dense and poor neighborhoods.

On 8 May, Indonesia received 1,389,600 doses of the Oxford–AstraZeneca vaccine under the COVAX initiative.

On 10 May, the National Commission of Adverse Events Following Immunization (AEFI) said it was not confirmed that the man who died hours after he was vaccinated with the Oxford–AstraZeneca vaccine in Jakarta was caused by the vaccine. This was not the first issue with the Oxford–AstraZeneca vaccine in Indonesia; previously, on 27 March, North Sulawesi temporarily halted the administration of the Oxford–AstraZeneca vaccine after at least five percent of the 3,990 patients inoculated reported adverse events following immunization. It was resumed on 30 March.

On 16 May, the Ministry of Health temporarily halted the distribution of 448,480 doses of the Oxford–AstraZeneca batch CTMAV547 vaccine.

On 17 May, an elderly in Jakarta died after being vaccinated with the Oxford–AstraZeneca vaccine, the second case in less than two weeks in the province.

On 25 May, eight million doses of CoronaVac arrived in Indonesia.

On 28 May, the Ministry of Health resumed the usage and distribution of the Oxford–AstraZeneca vaccine batch CTMAV547 vaccine.

On 31 May, eight million doses of CoronaVac arrived in Indonesia.

==== June ====
On 5 June, 313,100 doses of the AstraZeneca vaccine arrived in Indonesia.

On 8 June, Jakarta expanded its vaccination program for general public ages 18 and above.

On 10 June, 1.5 million doses of the Oxford–AstraZeneca vaccine arrived in Indonesia.

On 11 June, one million doses of the Sinopharm BIBP vaccine arrived in Indonesia.

On 17 June, Bali expanded its vaccination program to all residents age 18 and above.

On 20 June, 10 million doses of CoronaVac arrived in Indonesia.

On 25 June, the Ministry of Health decided to fasten the vaccination program by permitting everyone being vaccinated at their operating hospitals and polytechnics regardless of the domicile.

On 27 June, the National Agency of Drug and Food Control (BPOM) published an emergency use authorization for CoronaVac for ages 12 to 17.

On 30 June, the daily number of people vaccinated crossed one million mark for the first time and another 14 million doses of CoronaVac arrived in Indonesia.

==== July ====
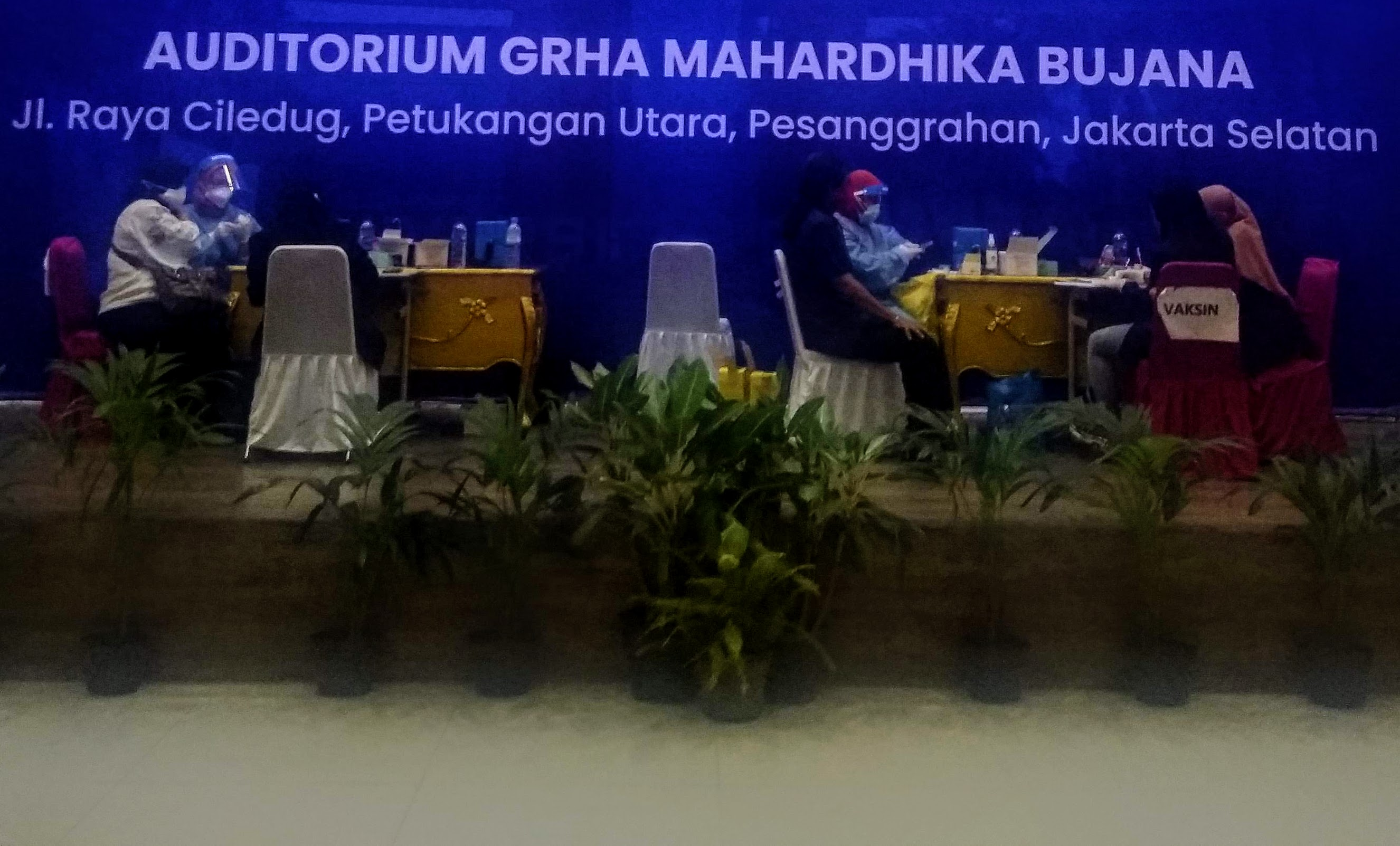
COVID-19 vaccination in South Jakarta.

On 1 July, 998,400 doses of the Oxford–AstraZeneca vaccine from Japan arrived in Indonesia.

On 2 July, the National Agency of Drug and Food Control of Indonesia (BPOM) published an emergency use authorization for the Moderna vaccine.

On 11 July, three million doses of the Moderna vaccine from the United States arrived in Indonesia.

On 12 July, 10 million doses of CoronaVac arrived in Indonesia.

On 13 July, 1,408,000 doses of the Sinopharm BIBP vaccine and 3,476,400 doses of the Oxford–AstraZeneca vaccine arrived in Indonesia.

On 14 July, the daily number of people vaccinated crossed two million mark for the first time.

On 15 July, the National Agency of Drug and Food Control of Indonesia (BPOM) published an emergency use authorization for the Pfizer–BioNTech vaccine. Also on this day, 1.5 million doses of the Moderna vaccine and 1.16 million doses of the Oxford–AstraZeneca vaccine arrived in Indonesia.

On 16 July, the third inoculation for healthcare workers program using the Moderna vaccine was started at Dr. Cipto Mangunkusumo Hospital and the government announced that paid Gotong Royong vaccination program by Kimia Farma was cancelled after they received criticism from people who demanded it to be free. Also on this day, 1.4 million doses of the Sinopharm BIBP and 1.04 million doses of the Oxford–AstraZeneca vaccine arrived in Indonesia.

On 19 July, 1,184,000 doses of the Sinopharm BIBP vaccine arrived in Indonesia.

On 22 July, eight million doses of CoronaVac arrived in Indonesia.

On 27 July, 21.2 million doses of CoronaVac arrived in Indonesia.

On 30 July, 1.5 million doses of the Sinopharm BIBP vaccine arrived in Indonesia.

==== August ====
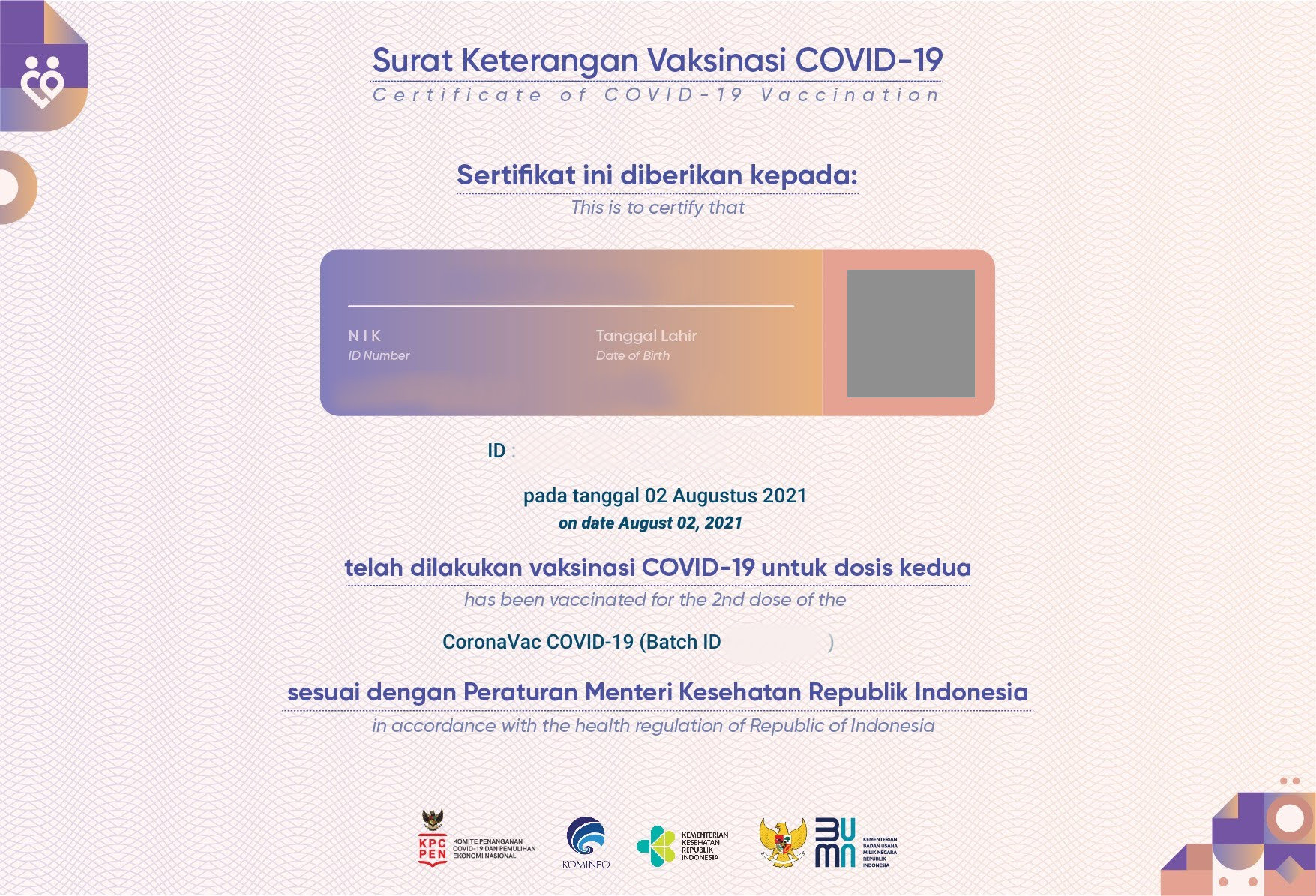
COVID-19 vaccination certificate issued by the Indonesian government for the second dose vaccination.

On 1 August, 3.5 million doses of the Moderna vaccine from the United States arrived in Indonesia.

On 2 August, 620,000 doses of the Oxford–AstraZeneca vaccine arrived in Indonesia.

On 3 August, 500,000 doses of the Sinopharm BIBP vaccine arrived in Indonesia.

On 6 August, 594,200 doses of the Oxford–AstraZeneca vaccine arrived in Indonesia.

On 12 August, a nurse in Pluit, North Jakarta was found to be innocent after a video where she was allegedly inoculated an empty vaccine syringe went viral on the internet. She admitted it was a pure accident and not intentional as she was fatigued.

On 13 August, at least 10% of Indonesian population had been fully vaccinated and five million doses of CoronaVac arrived in Indonesia.

On 14 August, Governor of Jakarta Anies Baswedan revealed that there were 3.7 million people who were not Jakarta's residents but got vaccinated in the province. This could cause Jakarta to vaccinate more than its population.

On 16 August, five million doses of CoronaVac arrived in Indonesia.

On 17 August, Jakarta allowed general public who were not health workers to be vaccinated with the Moderna vaccine.

On 19 August, 1.6 million doses of the Pfizer–BioNTech vaccine and 450,000 doses of the Oxford–AstraZeneca vaccine arrived in Indonesia.

On 20 August, five million doses of CoronaVac and 567,500 doses of the Oxford–AstraZeneca vaccine arrived in Indonesia.

On 23 August, five million doses of CoronaVac arrived in Indonesia.

On 24 August, at least half of Jakarta's population had been fully vaccinated.

On 25 August, the National Agency of Drug and Food Control of Indonesia (BPOM) published an emergency use authorization for the Sputnik V vaccine.

On 27 August, five million doses of CoronaVac and 1.86 million doses of the Oxford–AstraZeneca vaccine arrived in Indonesia.

On 30 August, 9.2 million doses of CoronaVac arrived in Indonesia.

==== September ====
On 1 September, 583,400 million doses of the Oxford–AstraZeneca vaccine arrived in Indonesia.

On 2 September, 1.2 million doses of the Pfizer–BioNTech vaccine and 500,000 doses of the Oxford–AstraZeneca vaccine arrived in Indonesia.

On 3 September, President Joko Widodo's vaccine certificate had become publicly accessible. This caused people to demand the Ministry of Communication and Information Technology to increase the safety of the PeduliLindungi app.

On 4 September, 207,000 doses of the Oxford–AstraZeneca vaccine arrived in Indonesia.

On 6 September, five million doses of CoronaVac arrived in Indonesia.

On 7 September, the National Agency of Drug and Food Control of Indonesia (BPOM) published the emergency use authorization for Convidecia and the Janssen vaccine.

On 8 September, 500,000 doses of the Oxford–AstraZeneca vaccine from Australia arrived in Indonesia.

On 10 September, 639,990 doses of the Pfizer–BioNTech vaccine, 973,700 doses of the Oxford–AstraZeneca vaccine, and, 2.08 million doses of CoronaVac arrived in Indonesia.

On 11 September, 500,000 doses of the Janssen vaccine and 2.075 million doses of CoronaVac arrived in Indonesia.

On 14 September, 1.8 million doses of CoronaVac arrived in Indonesia.

On 15 September, 274,950 doses of the Pfizer–BioNTech vaccine arrived in Indonesia.

On 16 September, 2.5 million doses of the Pfizer–BioNTech vaccine and 968,360 doses of the Oxford–AstraZeneca vaccine arrived in Indonesia.

On 17 September, 1.755 million doses of the Pfizer–BioNTech vaccine, 1.878 million doses of the Oxford–AstraZeneca vaccine, and five million doses of CoronaVac arrived in Indonesia.

On 19 September, 1.1 million doses of the Pfizer–BioNTech vaccine arrived in Indonesia.

On 20 September, five million doses of CoronaVac arrived in Indonesia.

On 21 September, five million doses of CoronaVac and 200,000 doses of the Sinopharm BIBP vaccine arrived in Indonesia.

On 22 September, 684,900 doses of the Oxford–AstraZeneca vaccine arrived in Indonesia.

On 23 September, 1.24 million doses of the Oxford–AstraZeneca vaccine and 2.17 million doses of the Pfizer–BioNTech vaccine arrived in Indonesia.

On 24 September, two million doses of CoronaVac arrived in Indonesia.

On 30 September, 796,800 doses of the Oxford–AstraZeneca vaccine from Italy arrived in Indonesia. Also on this day, the government allowed those who had been infected with COVID-19 to be vaccinated one month after recovered (for mild symptoms) and three months (for severe symptoms). The previous time span was three months (for both mild and severe symptoms).

==== October ====
On 1 October, 705,300 doses of the Oxford–AstraZeneca vaccine and 453,960 doses of the Pfizer–BioNTech vaccine arrived in Indonesia.

On 2 October, 600,000 doses of the Oxford–AstraZeneca vaccine arrived in Indonesia.

On 3 October, 800,280 doses of the Pfizer–BioNTech vaccine arrived in Indonesia.

On 7 October, the National Agency of Drug and Food Control of Indonesia (BPOM) published the emergency use authorization for Zifivax. Also on this day, 1.2 million doses of the Pfizer–BioNTech vaccine arrived in Indonesia.

On 8 October, 245,440 doses of the Oxford–AstraZeneca vaccine arrived in Indonesia.

On 10 October, 100 million Indonesians had received at least one dose of the vaccine. Also on this day, two million doses of the Pfizer–BioNTech vaccine arrived in Indonesia.

On 13 October, 688,800 doses of the Oxford–AstraZeneca vaccine arrived in Indonesia.

On 14 October, 672,600 doses of the Oxford–AstraZeneca vaccine and 601,380 doses of the Pfizer–BioNTech vaccine arrived in Indonesia.

On 17 October, 2.5 million doses of the Pfizer–BioNTech vaccine arrived in Indonesia.

On 19 October, 224,000 doses of the Oxford–AstraZeneca vaccine arrived in Indonesia.

On 20 October, 1.4 million doses of the Oxford–AstraZeneca vaccine arrived in Indonesia.

On 21 October, 1.2 million doses of the Pfizer–BioNTech vaccine and 698,090 doses of the Oxford–AstraZeneca vaccine arrived in Indonesia.

On 22 October, 1.18 million doses of the Pfizer–BioNTech vaccine and 844,820 doses of the Oxford–AstraZeneca vaccine arrived in Indonesia.

On 25 October, 684,400 doses of the Oxford–AstraZeneca vaccine from New Zealand arrived in Indonesia.

On 26 October, five million doses of CoronaVac arrived in Indonesia.

On 27 October, four million doses of CoronaVac arrived in Indonesia.

On 28 October, four million doses of CoronaVac and 677,430 doses of the Pfizer–BioNTech vaccine arrived in Indonesia.

On 29 October, four million doses of CoronaVac, 1.26 million doses of the Pfizer–BioNTech vaccine, and 1.34 million doses of the Oxford–AstraZeneca vaccine arrived in Indonesia.

On 30 October, 819,600 doses of the Moderna vaccine from the Netherlands arrived in Indonesia.

On 31 October, 339,300 doses of the Pfizer–BioNTech vaccine arrived in Indonesia.

==== November ====
On 1 November, four million doses of CoronaVac arrived in Indonesia. The vaccine had also been approved by the National Agency of Drug and Food Control of Indonesia (BPOM) for ages 6 to 11.

On 2 November, four million doses of CoronaVac and 134,560 doses of the Oxford–AstraZeneca vaccine arrived in Indonesia. Also on this day, the National Agency of Drug and Food Control of Indonesia (BPOM) published the emergency use authorization for the Novavax vaccine, becoming the first country to do so.

On 4 November, 680,100 doses of the Oxford–AstraZeneca vaccine arrived in Indonesia.

On 5 November, 69,030 doses of the Pfizer–BioNTech vaccine arrived in Indonesia.

On 8 November, four million doses of CoronaVac arrived in Indonesia.

On 9 November, four million doses of CoronaVac arrived in Indonesia.

On 10 November, 680,400 doses of the Moderna vaccine arrived in Indonesia.

On 11 November, 2.29 million doses of the Pfizer–BioNTech vaccine and 1.2 million doses of the Oxford–AstraZeneca vaccine arrived in Indonesia.

On 12 November, four million doses of CoronaVac arrived in Indonesia.

On 13 November, four million doses of CoronaVac arrived in Indonesia.

On 17 November, 1.2 million doses of the Oxford–AstraZeneca vaccine from Australia arrived in Indonesia.

On 19 November, 4.059 million doses of the Oxford–AstraZeneca vaccine and 800,000 doses of the Moderna vaccine arrived in Indonesia.

On 20 November, 2.6 million doses of the Pfizer–BioNTech vaccine arrived in Indonesia.

On 21 November, 2.26 million doses of the Pfizer–BioNTech vaccine arrived in Indonesia.

On 22 November, 866,970 doses of the Pfizer–BioNTech vaccine arrived in Indonesia.

On 24 November, 4.3 million doses of the Oxford–AstraZeneca vaccine arrived in Indonesia.

On 26 November, 706,680 doses of the Pfizer–BioNTech vaccine and 1.065 million doses of the Oxford–AstraZeneca vaccine arrived in Indonesia.

On 27 November, 2.707 million doses of the Oxford–AstraZeneca vaccine, 727,740 doses of the Pfizer–BioNTech vaccine, and 134,500 doses of the Novavax vaccine arrived in Indonesia.

On 28 November, 334,620 doses of the Pfizer–BioNTech vaccine and 705,600 doses of the Oxford–AstraZeneca vaccine arrived in Indonesia.

On 29 November, four million doses of CoronaVac arrived in Indonesia.

On 30 November, four million doses of CoronaVac and 1.7 million doses of the Oxford–AstraZeneca vaccine arrived in Indonesia.

==== December ====
On 1 December, 3.6 million doses of CoronaVac and 9.1 million doses of the Oxford–AstraZeneca vaccine arrived in Indonesia.

On 2 December, 191,880 doses of the Pfizer–BioNTech vaccine, 656,000 doses of the Oxford–AstraZeneca vaccine, and 4.865 million doses of the Novavax vaccine arrived in Indonesia.

On 3 December, 324,000 doses of the Janssen vaccine arrived in Indonesia.

On 5 December, 1.9 million doses of the Oxford–AstraZeneca vaccine arrived in Indonesia.

On 7 December, at least 100 million Indonesians had been fully vaccinated. Also on this day, 1.5 million doses of the Moderna vaccine arrived in Indonesia.

On 8 December, 767,520 doses of the Pfizer–BioNTech vaccine and four million doses of the Novavax vaccine arrived in Indonesia.

On 9 December, 336,960 doses of the Pfizer–BioNTech vaccine and 1.18 million doses of the Oxford–AstraZeneca vaccine arrived in Indonesia.

On 10 December, 1.21 million doses of the Pfizer–BioNTech vaccine arrived in Indonesia.

On 11 December, 2.04 million doses of the Pfizer–BioNTech vaccine and 1.75 million doses of the Oxford–AstraZeneca vaccine arrived in Indonesia.

On 12 December, 1.77 million doses of the Pfizer–BioNTech vaccine arrived in Indonesia.

On 13 December, the Ministry of Health announced the commencement of vaccination for ages 6 to 11. Also on this day, 3.53 million doses of the Pfizer–BioNTech vaccine arrived in Indonesia.

On 14 December, 1.76 million doses of the Pfizer–BioNTech vaccine arrived in Indonesia.

On 15 December, 1.095 million doses of the Oxford–AstraZeneca vaccine and 1.144 million doses of the Pfizer–BioNTech vaccine arrived in Indonesia.

On 16 December, 1.144 million doses of the Pfizer–BioNTech vaccine arrived in Indonesia.

On 20 December, 482,000 doses of the Oxford–AstraZeneca vaccine arrived in Indonesia.

On 21 December, a man in Pinrang, South Sulawesi went viral on the internet after he claimed that he had been vaccinated 17 times on behalf of other people. Also on this day, two million doses of CoronaVac arrived in Indonesia.

On 23 December, 1.5 million doses of the Moderna vaccine arrived in Indonesia.

On 24 December, 2.688 million doses of the Moderna vaccine and 342,810 doses of the Pfizer–BioNTech vaccine arrived in Indonesia.

On 25 December, 922,800 doses of the Moderna vaccine and 1.47 million doses of the Pfizer–BioNTech vaccine arrived in Indonesia.

On 26 December, 1.42 million doses of the Moderna vaccine, 4.478 million doses of the Oxford–AstraZeneca, and 3.086 million doses of the Pfizer–BioNTech vaccine arrived in Indonesia.

On 27 December, 6.683 million doses of the Oxford–AstraZeneca vaccine arrived in Indonesia.

On 28 December, 5.787 million doses of the Oxford–AstraZeneca vaccine arrived in Indonesia.

On 29 December, 1.236 million doses of CoronaVac arrived in Indonesia.

On 30 December, 438,750 doses of the Pfizer–BioNTech vaccine arrived in Indonesia.

On 31 December, 819,000 doses of the Pfizer–BioNTech vaccine and nine million doses of CoronaVac arrived in Indonesia.

=== 2022 ===
==== January ====
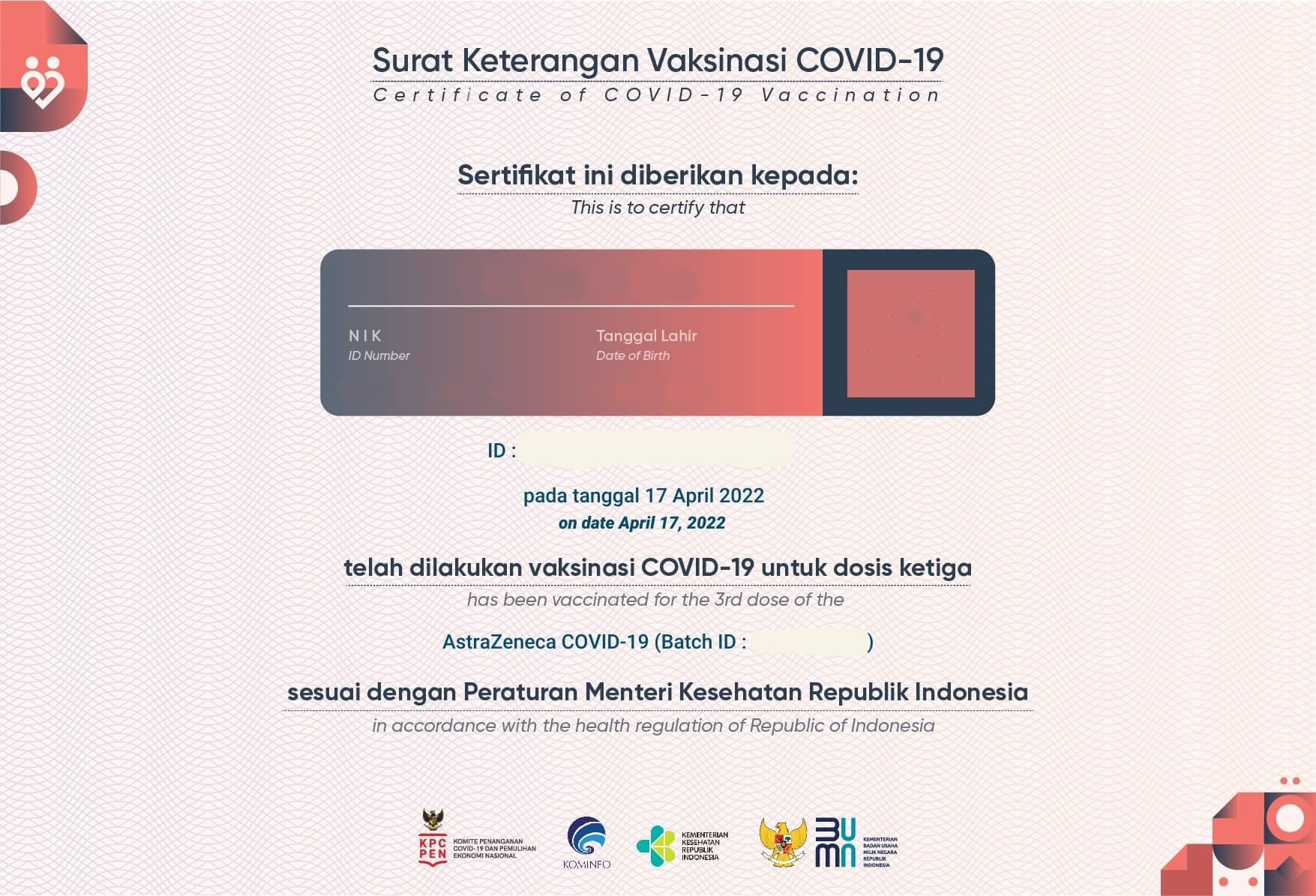
COVID-19 vaccination certificate issued by the Indonesian government for the third dose vaccination.

On 1 January, 1.2 million doses of the Pfizer–BioNTech vaccine arrived in Indonesia.

On 3–4 January, 3.566 million doses of the Oxford–AstraZeneca vaccine arrived in Indonesia.

On 7 January, 1.252 million doses of the Oxford–AstraZeneca vaccine arrived in Indonesia.

On 8 January, 3.182 million doses of the Oxford–AstraZeneca vaccine arrived in Indonesia.

On 11 January, 1.847 million doses of the Oxford–AstraZeneca vaccine arrived in Indonesia.

On 12 January, Indonesia started to inoculate the third or booster shots for general public using five vaccine brands. The government set a minimum of six months to elapse after the completion of primary vaccine before the booster dose could be administered.

On 16 January, 896,000 doses of the Oxford–AstraZeneca vaccine and six million doses of CoronaVac arrived in Indonesia.

On 17 January, five million doses of CoronaVac arrived in Indonesia.

On 18 January, 1.4 million doses of the Oxford–AstraZeneca vaccine arrived in Indonesia.

On 19 January, 651,130 doses of the Oxford–AstraZeneca vaccine arrived in Indonesia.

On 22 January, 1.257 million doses of the Pfizer–BioNTech vaccine arrived in Indonesia.

On 28 January, 2.968 million doses of the Oxford–AstraZeneca vaccine arrived in Indonesia.

==== February ====
On 9 February, 2.7 million doses of the Oxford–AstraZeneca vaccine arrived in Indonesia. With this shipment, the number of vaccine doses received by Indonesia crossed a milestone of 500 million.

On 13 February, the Ministry of Health required those who missed to be inoculated with the second dose six months after the first dose to restart the vaccination process again. Additionally, those that lapsed no longer than six months are still allowed to receive the second dose. In both cases, vaccination with other brand is possible depends on the expiration date of the vaccine. The policy was initiated to tackle the slow second dose vaccination rate, with 2.5 million people being only vaccinated once after six months.

On 21 February, the government changed the gap between the second dose and the third dose of the vaccine from a minimum time of six months to three months for elderlies. Five days later, on 26 February, they allowed it for general public all ages.

==== March-April ====
On 4 March, 3.5 million doses of the Pfizer–BioNTech vaccine arrived in Indonesia.

On 7 March, the government had allowed domestic travellers by air, land, and water transport to travel without an antigen or PCR test result if they had been vaccinated at least twice.

On 10 March, the government extended the expiration date of 18 million vaccines as it would be expired in the near future.

On 23 March, the government allowed travellers from abroad who were tested negative and had been vaccinated with the second or the third dose of the vaccine to enter Indonesia without following mandatory quarantine.

On 31 March, Jakarta became the first province to fully vaccinate 100% of its population. However, this data may not reflect the actual situation as many people outside Jakarta also got vaccinated in the province.

==== May-September ====
On 11 May, the European Union (EU) approved the PeduliLindungi app to be used in the region.

On 15 May, the Association of the Southeast Asian Nations (ASEAN) approved the PeduliLindungi app to be used in the region.

==== October ====
On 13 October, President Joko Widodo officially launched IndoVac, a COVID-19 vaccine developed by Indonesian pharmaceutical company Bio Farma and Baylor College of Medicine in Houston, Texas.

==== November ====
On 29 November, National Agency of Drug and Food Control (BPOM) published an emergency use authorization on the use of Pfizer–BioNTech for children of 5 to 11 years old.

==== December ====
On 11 December, National Agency of Drug and Food Control (BPOM) published an emergency use authorization on the use of Pfizer–BioNTech for infants of 6 months old up to 4 years old.

== Vaccines on order ==
Vaccine	Approval	Deployment
CoronaVac	Yes	Yes
Oxford–AstraZeneca	Yes	Yes
Sinopharm BIBP	Yes	Yes
Moderna	Yes	Yes
Pfizer–BioNTech	Yes	Yes
Janssen	Yes	Yes
Novavax	Yes	Yes
Sputnik V	Yes	Yes
Convidecia	Yes	Yes
Zifivax	Yes	Yes

== Vaccines in trial stage ==
Vaccine	Type (technology)	Phase I	Phase II	Phase III
CoronaVac	Inactivated	Completed	Completed	Completed
Zifivax	Subunit (recombinant)	Completed	Completed	Completed
ARCoV	RNA	Completed	Completed	In progress
West China Hospital	Subunit (recombinant)	Completed	Completed	In progress
GX-19	DNA	Completed	In progress	In progress
AV-COVID-19	Viral vector	In progress	In progress	Not yet

== Statistics ==
Vaccination numbers may not be accurate due to different calculations, cut-off times, and sources from the government. Lower daily inoculations may be recorded on Sundays and public holidays.

=== By group ===
Vaccination numbers by group
Group	Target	First dose		Second dose		Third dose		Fourth dose	
Group	Target	Total	Percentage	Total	Percentage	Total	Percentage	Total	Percentage
Health professionals	1,468,764	2,049,957	139.57%	2,012,511	137.02%	1,812,332	123.39%	837,536	57.02%
Public officers	17,327,167	18,309,328	105.67%	17,086,258	98.61%	9,789,865	56.5%	53,736	0.31%
Elderlies (Note: Elderlies are defined as anyone ages 60 or above.)	21,553,118	18,325,455	85.02%	15,230,265	70.66%	7,273,762	33.75%	460,636	2.14%
Susceptible and general public (Note: Mostly include people age 18 to 59.)	141,211,181	117,153,978	82.96%	99,712,043	70.61%	48,462,995	34.32%	232,496	0.16%
Teenagers (Note: Teenagers are defined as anyone ages 12 to 17.)	26,705,490	25,537,029	95.62%	22,335,685	83.64%	1,535,957	5.75%	0	0%
Children (Note: Children are defined as anyone ages 6 to 11.)	26,400,300	21,712,250	82.24%	17,631,373	66.78%	1,714	0.01%	0	0%
Private vaccinations (Note: Also known as the Gotong Royong vaccination program. Through this program, the government would seek help from private sectors and would be paid by the companies instead of individually.)	N/A	1,178,658	N/A	1,123,758	N/A	720,849	N/A	760	N/A
Total	234,666,020	204,266,655	87.05%	175,131,893	74.63%	69,597,474	29.66%	1,585,164	0.68%
Data as of 5 February 2023, 20:51 WIB

=== By province ===
Vaccination numbers by province
Province	Target	First dose		Percentage of population with at least one dose (Note: The population data is from Statistics Indonesia's census in 2020.)	Second dose		Percentage of population fully vaccinated (Note: Fully vaccinated people are those who have been vaccinated twice (except for the Janssen vaccine). The second dose would be inoculated 14 to 84 days after the first dose.)	Third dose		Percentage of population with one booster shot (Note: The first booster shot or the third dose would be given six months after the second dose.)	Fourth dose		Percentage of population with two booster shots
Province	Target	Total	Percentage	Percentage of population with at least one dose	Total	Percentage	Percentage of population fully vaccinated	Total	Percentage	Percentage of population with one booster shot	Total	Percentage	Percentage of population with two booster shots
Aceh	4,028,891	4,150,756	103.02%	78.69%	3,397,749	84.33%	64.41%	1,382,857	34.32%	26.22%	22,274	0.55%	0.42%
Bali	3,405,130	3,971,583	116.64%	91.99%	3,689,316	108.35%	85.45%	2,155,172	63.29%	49.92%	59,900	1.76%	1.39%
Bangka Belitung Islands	1,137,824	1,122,594	98.66%	77.12%	974,868	85.68%	66.97%	355,707	31.26%	24.44%	6,077	0.53%	0.42%
Banten	9,229,383	8,827,755	95.65%	74.15%	7,287,665	78.96%	61.22%	3,017,852	32.7%	25.35%	39,312	0.43%	0.33%
Bengkulu	1,553,792	1,487,479	95.73%	73.98%	1,223,056	78.71%	60.83%	425,345	27.37%	21.15%	5,322	0.34%	0.26%
Central Java	28,727,805	27,045,338	94.14%	74.06%	24,216,747	84.3%	66.32%	8,566,987	29.82%	23.46%	170,334	0.59%	0.47%
Central Kalimantan	2,036,104	2,047,842	100.58%	76.7%	1,757,857	86.33%	65.84%	638,971	31.38%	23.93%	14,931	0.73%	0.56%
Central Sulawesi	2,135,907	1,897,508	88.84%	63.55%	1,321,473	61.87%	44.26%	355,029	16.62%	11.89%	5,345	0.25%	0.18%
East Java	31,826,206	30,268,177	95.1%	74.43%	26,397,764	82.94%	64.91%	9,253,657	29.08%	22.76%	242,035	0.76%	0.6%
East Kalimantan	2,874,401	2,971,223	103.37%	78.9%	2,643,762	91.98%	70.2%	1,190,641	41.42%	31.62%	22,220	0.77%	0.59%
East Nusa Tenggara	3,831,439	3,685,830	96.2%	69.21%	2,872,928	74.98%	53.95%	649,004	16.94%	12.19%	10,068	0.26%	0.19%
Gorontalo	938,409	874,784	93.22%	74.66%	665,657	70.93%	56.81%	181,478	19.34%	15.49%	4,021	0.43%	0.34%
Jakarta	8,395,427	12,636,915	150.52%	119.64%	10,927,844	130.16%	103.46%	5,343,543	63.65%	50.59%	161,013	1.92%	1.52%
Jambi	2,686,193	2,661,502	99.08%	75.01%	2,159,681	80.4%	60.87%	733,376	27.3%	20.67%	7,881	0.29%	0.22%
Lampung	10,860,987	6,123,896	56.38%	67.98%	5,033,571	46.35%	55.88%	1,632,986	15.04%	18.13%	18,559	0.17%	0.21%
Maluku	1,417,690	1,084,347	76.49%	58.65%	722,990	51%	39.1%	222,588	15.7%	12.04%	2,327	0.16%	0.13%
North Kalimantan	545,672	532,580	97.6%	75.89%	452,611	82.95%	64.49%	169,649	31.09%	24.17%	4,575	0.84%	0.65%
North Maluku	954,092	862,900	90.44%	67.26%	636,971	66.76%	49.65%	199,729	20.93%	15.57%	1,223	0.13%	0.1%
North Sulawesi	2,080,685	1,894,101	91.03%	72.24%	1,456,262	69.99%	55.54%	482,874	23.21%	18.42%	9,180	0.44%	0.35%
North Sumatra	11,419,559	11,199,413	98.07%	75.67%	9,877,165	86.49%	66.74%	4,228,126	37.03%	28.57%	51,347	0.45%	0.35%
Papua	2,583,771	891,364	34.5%	20.71%	688,195	26.64%	15.99%	237,127	9.18%	5.51%	3,329	0.13%	0.08%
Riau	4,840,347	4,882,950	100.88%	76.37%	4,023,545	83.13%	62.93%	1,422,122	29.38%	22.24%	14,406	0.3%	0.23%
Riau Islands	1,581,035	1,780,420	112.61%	86.24%	1,561,140	98.74%	75.62%	776,217	49.1%	37.6%	9,250	0.59%	0.45%
South Kalimantan	3,161,137	3,043,871	96.29%	74.72%	2,477,685	78.38%	60.82%	879,783	27.83%	21.6%	16,948	0.54%	0.42%
South Sulawesi	7,058,141	6,426,083	91.04%	70.82%	4,918,735	69.69%	54.21%	1,294,481	18.34%	14.27%	20,092	0.28%	0.22%
South Sumatra	6,303,096	6,098,326	96.75%	72.02%	4,980,974	79.02%	58.83%	1,446,159	22.94%	17.08%	28,640	0.45%	0.34%
Southeast Sulawesi	2,002,579	1,801,258	89.95%	68.62%	1,339,911	66.91%	51.05%	345,373	17.25%	13.16%	6,425	0.32%	0.24%
Special Region of Yogyakarta	2,879,699	3,244,558	112.67%	88.44%	3,045,814	105.77%	83.02%	1,317,278	45.74%	35.91%	40,297	1.4%	1.1%
West Java	37,907,814	36,771,791	97%	76.17%	32,551,678	85.87%	67.43%	15,666,091	41.33%	32.45%	151,382	0.4%	0.31%
West Kalimantan	3,872,477	3,518,987	90.87%	64.99%	2,921,532	75.44%	53.96%	801,233	20.69%	14.8%	17,034	0.44%	0.31%
West Nusa Tenggara	3,910,638	3,906,192	99.89%	73.42%	3,458,624	88.44%	65.01%	1,450,319	37.09%	27.26%	15,063	0.39%	0.28%
West Papua	797,402	518,789	65.06%	45.75%	387,718	48.62%	34.19%	148,442	18.62%	13.09%	931	0.12%	0.08%
West Sulawesi	1,089,240	878,399	80.64%	61.89%	621,402	57.05%	43.78%	133,873	12.29%	9.43%	1,563	0.14%	0.11%
West Sumatra	4,408,509	4,172,697	94.65%	75.39%	3,348,937	75.97%	60.51%	1,109,362	25.16%	20.04%	10,185	0.23%	0.18%
Total	234,666,020	204,080,880	86.97%	75.53%	174,854,075	74.51%	64.71%	68,771,161	29.31%	25.45%	1,193,489	0.51%	0.44%
Data as of 8 January 2023, 17:25 WIB

== Challenges ==
Only 64.81% of the Indonesian population has been fully vaccinated. This is caused by several problems and challenges. First, Indonesia lacks vaccines and human resources to support the program. The country also struggles to distribute the vaccines equally to all regions, especially to rural and remote areas. Some provinces have vaccinated its population multiple times more than other provinces. Hoaxes and fake news have also caused many Indonesians to question the efficiency of the vaccine, leading to them choosing not to be vaccinated.

== Effectiveness ==
On 23 April 2021, a public health office in Semarang reported that 411 of vaccinated individuals had contracted COVID-19. 267 of them were infected after the first dose, while 144 after the second dose.

Based on observations on about 120,000 public health workers in Jakarta who were vaccinated from January to March, 28 days after the second dose, CoronaVac prevents 94% of COVID-19 symptoms, 96% in preventing hospitalization, and 98% in preventing deaths. But after the first dose, the effectiveness against the symptoms is only 13%.

During an outbreak in Kudus, Central Java, from 6,000 health professionals who were inoculated with CoronaVac, as of 12 June 2021, 308 of them were infected with COVID-19, 277 practice self-isolation, and 193 recovered. The director of Dr. Loekmono Hadi Regional General Hospital, dr. Abdul Aziz Achyar, stated the vaccines were proven to be able to reduce sickness and death risk from COVID-19.

On 18 June 2021, Reuters reported that more than 350 Indonesian doctors and medical workers had contracted SARS-CoV-2 despite being vaccinated with CoronaVac. Griffith University epidemiologist, Dicky Budiman, said that it was unclear how effective CoronaVac was against the Delta variant.

Based on observations study on 86,936 Jakarta residents aged 60 and above from March to April, CoronaVac is 85% effective against symptomatic illness and 92% against hospitalization. If only the first dose is given, the effectiveness against symptomatic illness is reduced to 35%.

== Controversies ==
As one of the first public figures who received a COVID-19 vaccine inoculation, Raffi Ahmad was criticized for breaking health protocols during a party the night after he was vaccinated.
