= IndoVac =

Vaccine against COVID-19

Vaccine description
- Target: SARS-CoV-2
- Vaccine type: Protein subunit

Clinical data
- Trade names: IndoVac
- Routes of administration: Intramuscular

IndoVac is a recombinant protein subunit COVID-19 vaccine, developed by Indonesian pharmaceutical company Bio Farma and Baylor College of Medicine in Houston, Texas. It is the world's first officially halal certified COVID-19 vaccine, but the most popular existing vaccines had already been widely endorsed as Halal by various Islamic groups. The vaccine was officially launched by President Joko Widodo on 13 October 2022.

== Technology ==
The vaccine consists of an active yeast-based receptor binding domain (RBD) of the SARS‑CoV‑2 spike protein. With no animal cells or products being used in its production, IndoVac received its halal certificate from the Halal Product Assurance Organizing Body of the Ministry of Religious Affairs on 29 July 2022.

== Manufacturing ==
In October 2022, President Joko Widodo announced that Bio Farma will produce up to 20 million doses of the vaccine for the initial first phase of production in the same year. The production capacity will be increased to 40 million doses in 2023.
