= West China Hospital COVID-19 vaccine =

Vaccine candidate against COVID-19

Vaccine description
- Target: SARS-CoV-2
- Vaccine type: Protein subunit

Clinical data
- Routes of administration: Intramuscular

Identifiers
- DrugBank: DB16443

West China Hospital COVID-19 vaccine is a COVID-19 vaccine candidate developed by West China Hospital.

== Clinical trials ==
In August 2020, WestVac Biopharma started phase I clinical trials with 168 participants in China.

In November, WestVac Biopharma started phase II clinical trials with 960 participants in China In February 2021, WestVac Biopharma started phase IIb clinical trials with 4,000 participants in China. Later, WestVac Biopharma is no longer on phase IIb clinical trial.

In June 2021, WestVac Biopharma started phase III trials with 40,000 participants including Indonesia, Kenya, and the Philippines.

=== Children and adolescents trials ===
In August 2021 WestVac Biopharma started phase I/II trials with 600 participants for children and adolescents aged 6-17.
