= GX-19 =

Vaccine candidate against COVID-19

Vaccine description
- Target: SARS-CoV-2
- Vaccine type: DNA

Clinical data
- Other names: GX-19N
- Routes of administration: Intramuscular

Identifiers
- DrugBank: DB15891

GX-19 is a COVID-19 vaccine candidate developed by Genexine consortium.

It is a DNA-based vaccine that encodes the SARS-CoV-2 spike protein.
