= Kimia Farma =

Indonesian pharmaceuticals company

PT Kimia Farma Tbk
- Current logo since 2002
- Type: Public
- Traded as: IDX: KAEF; FWB: HQP
- Industry: Pharmaceuticals
- Founded: 1971
- Headquarters: Jakarta, Indonesia
- Products: pharmacy
- Revenue: ▲ Rp 9.400 trillion (2019)
- Net income: ▲ Rp 15.89 billion (2019)
- Total assets: ▲ Rp 18.352 trillion (2019)
- Total equity: ▲ Rp 7.412 trillion (2019)
- Owner: Bio Farma
- Number of employees: 13,052 (2019)
- Subsidiaries: Kimia Farma Apotek; Phapros; Sinkona Indonesia Lestari; Kimia Farma Trading & Distribution; Kimia Farma Sungwun Pharmacopia; Kimia Farma Dawaa Co., Ltd
- Website: www.kimiafarma.co.id

PT Kimia Farma Tbk is an Indonesian pharmaceutical producer and distributor in Indonesia. It is based in Jakarta.

== History ==
In 1957, Dutch East Indies-owned pharmaceutical firms were nationalized by the Government of Indonesia. Nationalized firms included N. V. Pharmaceutische Handelsvereeniging J. van Gorkom & Co., (Jakarta), N. V. Chemicaliënhandel Rathkamp & Co., (Jakarta), N. V. Bandoengsche Kininefabriek, (Bandung), N. V. Jodium Onderneming Watoedakon (Mojokerto) and N. V. Verbandstoffenfabriek (Surakarta).

Following Government Regulation no. 69 in 1968 the resulting firms were named State Pharmaceutical Companies (PNF) named PNF Radja Farma (Jakarta), PNF Conscience Farma (Jakarta), PNF Nakula Farma (Jakarta), PNF Bio Farma, State Enterprise (PN) Bhineka Kina Farma (Bandung), PN Sari Husada (Yogyakarta) and PN Pharmaceuticals and medical devices Kasa Husada (Surabaya).

On 23 January 1969, based on PP. 3 In 1969 the companies merged into PNF Bhineka Kimia Farma. On 16 August 1971, the State Pharmaceutical companies transition Kimia Farma's legal form into State Owned status as a Limited Liability Company, becoming PT. Kimia Farma (Persero).

In 1998, the Asian economic crisis resulted in the state budget experiencing growing national debt. To reduce the burden of debt, the government began privatizating state-owned firms. Based on the Letter of Minister of State for Investment and Development, S-59/M-PM.BUMN/2000 dated 7 March 2000, PT. Kimia Farma privatized.

The directors of PT. Kimia Farma (Limited) established two subsidiaries on the 4 January 2002, PT. Pharmacy and PT Kimia Farma. Kimia Farma Trading and Distribution. On 4 July 2002 PT. Kimia Farma Tbk. officially listed on the Jakarta Stock Exchange (JSX) and the Surabaya Stock Exchange (BES) as a public company and changed its name to PT. Kimia Farma (Persero), Tbk.

== Controversies ==
In May 2021, a local Medan manager and four other employees working for Kimia Farma were arrested for washing and reusing COVID-19 nasal cotton swabs up to 20,000 times on 9,000 passengers flying through Kualanamu International Airport since December 2020. The workers were suspected to have pocketed as much as 1.8 billion Indonesian rupiah (~$125,000 USD), some of which allegedly went toward a lavish house for one of the suspects. While Kimia Farma has fired the employees-in-question, two human rights lawyers, Ranto Sibarani and Kamal Pane, who were frequent fliers during the time period, have filed a lawsuit against the firm, seeking damages of Rp. 1 billion (~$69,000 USD) per affected passenger.

== Factory ==
Five production facilities spread across major cities in Indonesia manufacture pharmaceuticals.

- Jakarta Plant produces dosage tablets, coated tablets, capsules, granules, syrup, dry suspension / syrup, eye drops, creams, antibiotics and injections.
- Bandung Plant produces raw materials and derivatives quinine, rifampicin, medicine native to Indonesia and an intrauterine device (IUD).
- Semarang Factory specialized in the production of castor oil, vegetable oils and cosmetics (talc).
- Watudakon Factory in East Java is the only plant that processes mine iodine in Indonesia.
- Tanjung Morawa Factory in Padang, North Sumatra, supplies drugs in Sumatra.

== Foreign branch ==
Kimia Farma planned to open a branch drugstore in Malaysia, as revealed in 2012.
