= Bio Farma =

Indonesian vaccine company

PT Bio Farma (Persero)

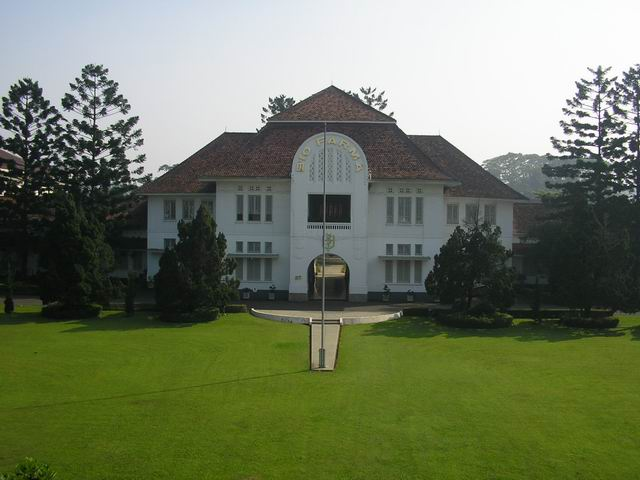
- Headquarters of Bio Farma in Bandung, 2005
- Type: State-owned PT
- Industry: Pharmaceuticals
- Predecessor: Pasteur Institute of Indonesia (1890–1960)
- Founded: 6 August 1890 as Parc-vaccinogène
- Headquarters: Bandung, West Java, Indonesia
- Products: Vaccine
- Owners: Government of Indonesia
- Subsidiaries: Kimia Farma; Indofarma; INUKI
- Website: www.biofarma.co.id/en/

PT Bio Farma (Persero) is an Indonesian state-owned enterprise based in Bandung, West Java and the only local vaccine manufacturer in Indonesia, which produces vaccines and sera to support immunization in Indonesia and other countries. Bio Farma vaccine produced vaccines against measles, polio, hepatitis B, and pentavalent vaccine. Bio Farma has supplied vaccines to multiple countries through UNICEF, PAHO and other organizations. Since 2020, it also serves as the holding company for listed state-owned enterprises Kimia Farma and Indofarma.

== History ==
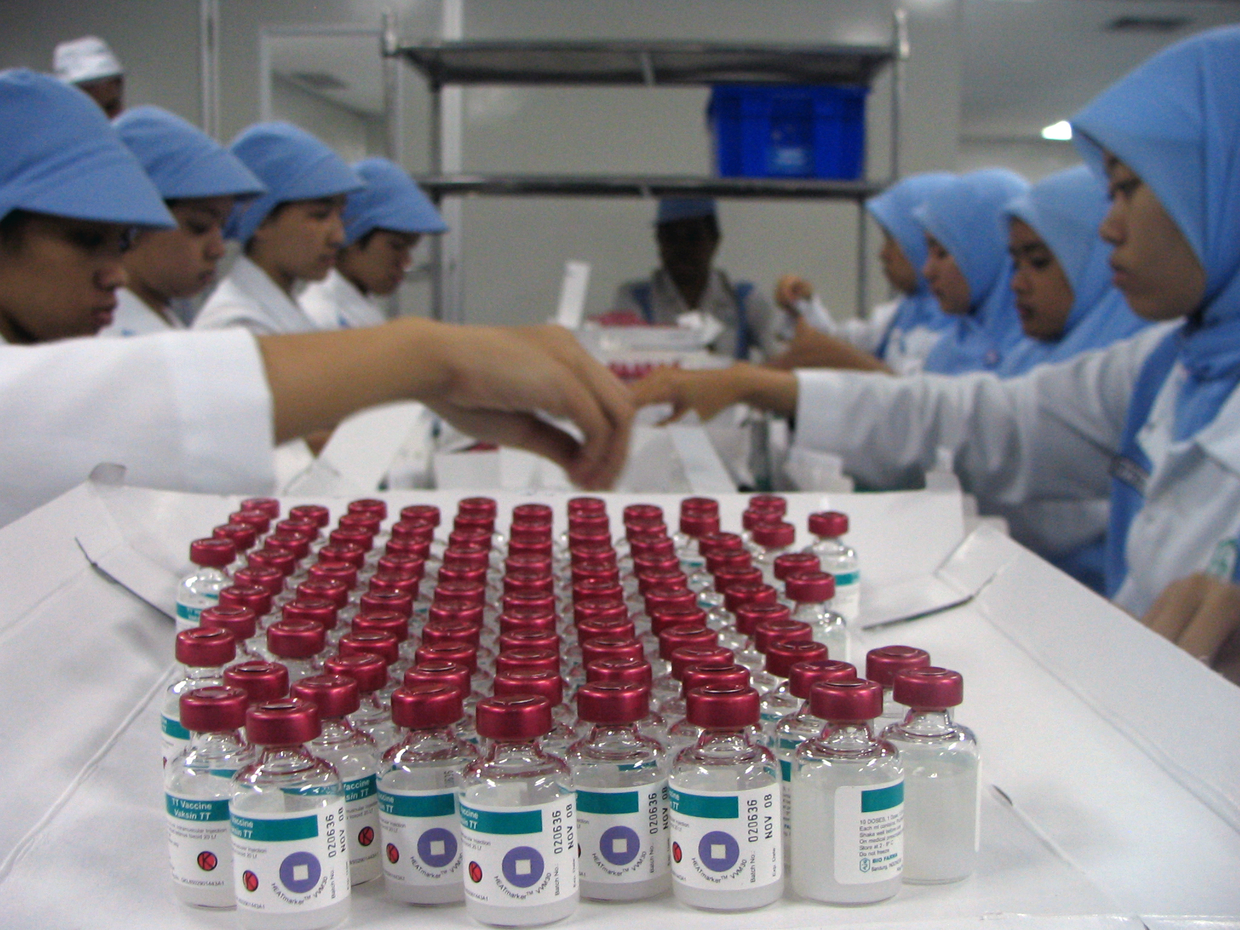
Vaccine vials in Bio Farma, 2017

Bio Farma's history began during the Dutch East Indies period, when the colonial government founded Parc-vaccinogène (State Vaccine Development Agency) on 6 August 1890. The agency occupied a building in Weltevreden – Batavia, which is now Gatot Soebroto Army Hospital. Since its inception, Parc-vaccinogène focused on eliminating infectious diseases, which leads to its cooperation with Pasteur Institute. Eventually, the agency was renamed to Parc-vaccinogène en Instituut Pasteur in 1895.

During the administration of J.P. van Limburg Stirum, Hendrik Tillema recommended to move the capital of Dutch East Indies to Bandung due to its natural conditions and hilly terrain, making it easier to defend. The idea was gradually accepted and began to be implemented by the Dutch colonial government in early 1920s after it was supported by Prof. J. Klopper, Rector of Technische Hogeschool te Bandoeng at the time. Government and private offices along with other agencies began moving to Bandung, including the foreign trade office, Salvation Army, government bodies and 's Lands Koepok Inrichting en het Instituut Pasteur, which stayed in Bandung until the present day. The agency has experienced several changes in name and legal entity, which are as follows:

- 1890-1895 – Parc-vaccinogène
- 1895-1901 – Parc-vaccinogène en Instituut Pasteur
- 1902-1941 – Landskoepok-Inrichting en Instituut Pasteur
- 1942-1945 – Bandung Epidemics Institute (バンドン防疫研究所, Bandon Bōeki Kenkyūsho), under Japanese occupation
- 1945-1949 – Gedung Cacar dan Lembaga Pasteur, after Indonesian independence. During the independence war, its activities moved to Klaten, Yogyakarta
- 1946-1949 – Since Bandung is under Dutch control during the independence war, the name of the Bandung facility reverted to Landskoepok-Inrichting en Instituut Pasteur
- 1950-1954 – Gedung Cacar dan Lembaga Pasteur, Independence war is over and the agency returned to Bandung
- 1955-1960 – Perusahaan Negara Pasteur
- 1961-1978 – Perusahaan Negara Bio Farma
- 1978-1997 – Perusahaan Umum Bio Farma
- 1997–present – PT Bio Farma (Persero)
