= Suzuki Carry =

Kei truck produced by the Japanese automaker Suzuki

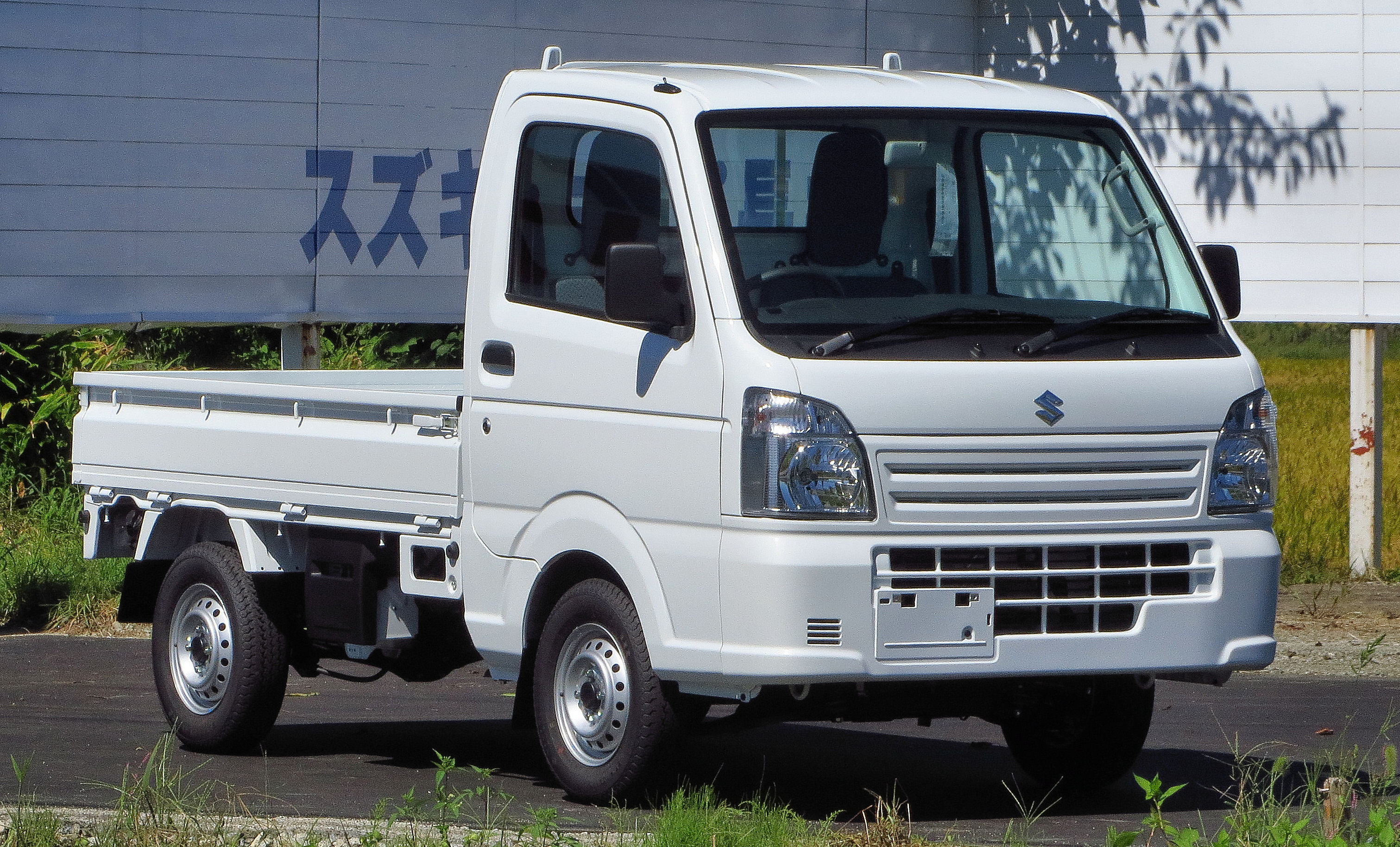
- Suzuki Carry KC 4WD truck (DA16T)

Overview
- Manufacturer: Suzuki
- Production: 1961–present

Body and chassis
- Class: Kei truck; Microvan (Japan); Light commercial vehicle (outside Japan)

Chronology
- Predecessor: Suzulight SP

The Suzuki Carry (Japanese: スズキ・キャリイ, Hepburn: Suzuki Kyarī) is a kei truck produced by the Japanese automaker Suzuki. The microvan version was originally called the Carry van until 1982 when the passenger van versions were renamed as the Suzuki Every (Japanese: スズキ・エブリイ, Hepburn: Suzuki Eburī). In Japan, the Carry is a kei car but the export market versions and derivatives have been fitted with engines of up to 1.6 liters displacement. They have been sold under a myriad of different names in several countries, and is the only car to have been offered with Chevrolet as well as Ford badges.

== Introduction ==
In their home market, the Carry truck and van (and Every van) have traditionally competed with a number of similarly sized vehicles, such as the Kurogane Baby, Honda Acty, Subaru Sambar, Mitsubishi Minicab, and Daihatsu Hijet. Some of these are also competitors in export markets, mainly the Carry and the Hijet.

The first two generations of Carrys were sold with the Suzulight badge rather than the company name Suzuki, emphasizing the company's focus on "Light Cars" (also known as kei jidosha).

== First generation (FB/FBD; 1961) ==
First generation (FB/FBD)
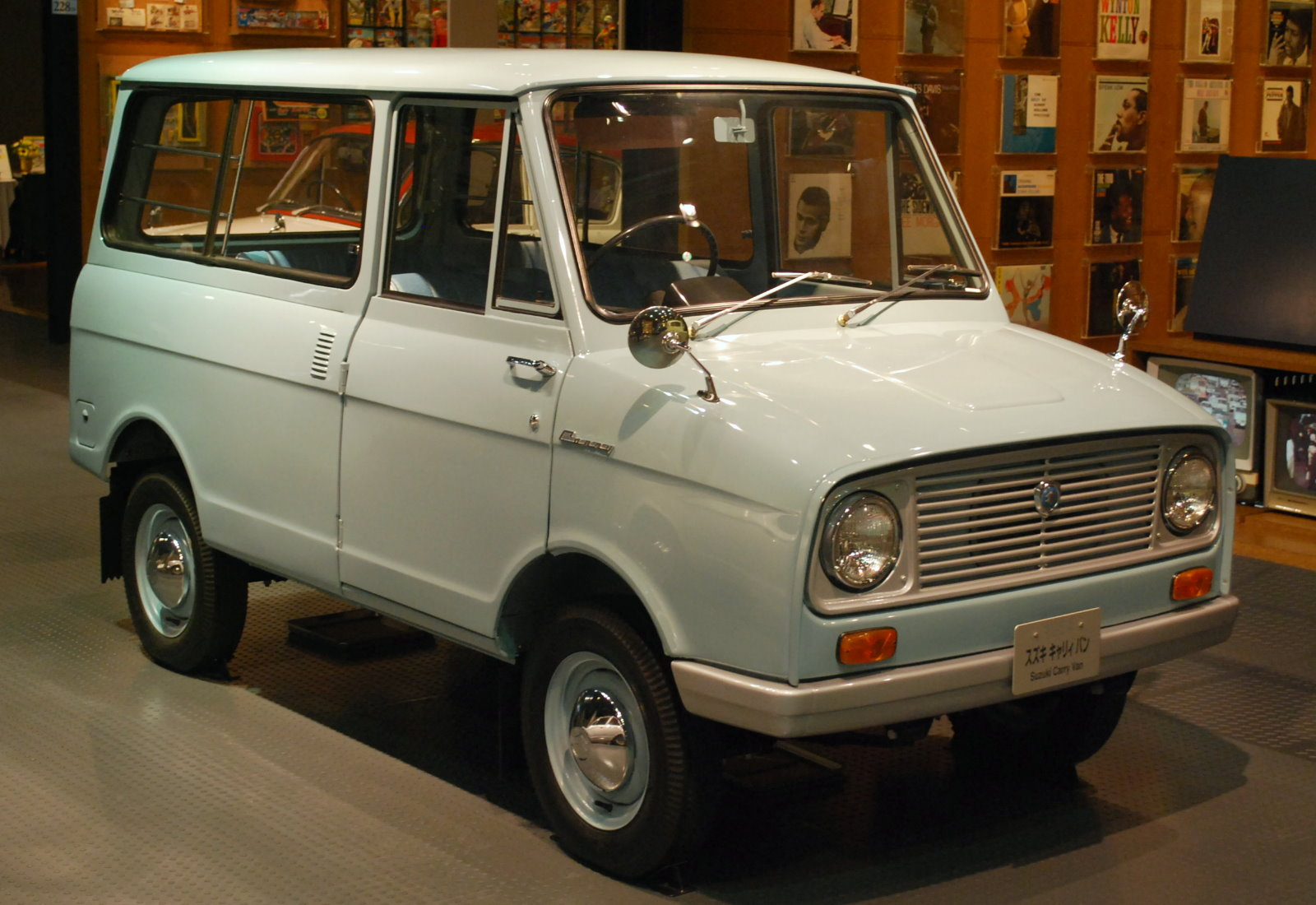
- 1964–1965 Suzulight Carry van (FBD)

Overview
- Also called: Suzulight Carry; Suzuki FB
- Production: 1961–1965
- Assembly: Japan: Toyokawa, Aichi

Body and chassis
- Body style: 2-door pickup 3-/4-door van
- Layout: FMR layout

Powertrain
- Engine: 359 cc FB two-stroke I2

The Carry series was born in October 1961 with the FB Suzulight Carry, a pickup truck with the engine underneath the front seat, but with a short bonnet. The layout has been referred to as a "semicabover". The FB Carry underwent some light modifications in October 1963, for the 1964 model year. A glassed FBD Carry Van was added in September 1964. The engine was called the FB, a 359 cc (21.9 cu in) air-cooled, two-stroke two-cylinder with 21 PS (15 kW). This engine remained in use, in three-cylinder form, until late 1987 in the Suzuki Jimny (as the LJ50). Top speed was no more than 76 km/h (47 mph). FB suspension was rigid with leaf springs, front and rear. A panel van (FBC) was also available from July 1962.

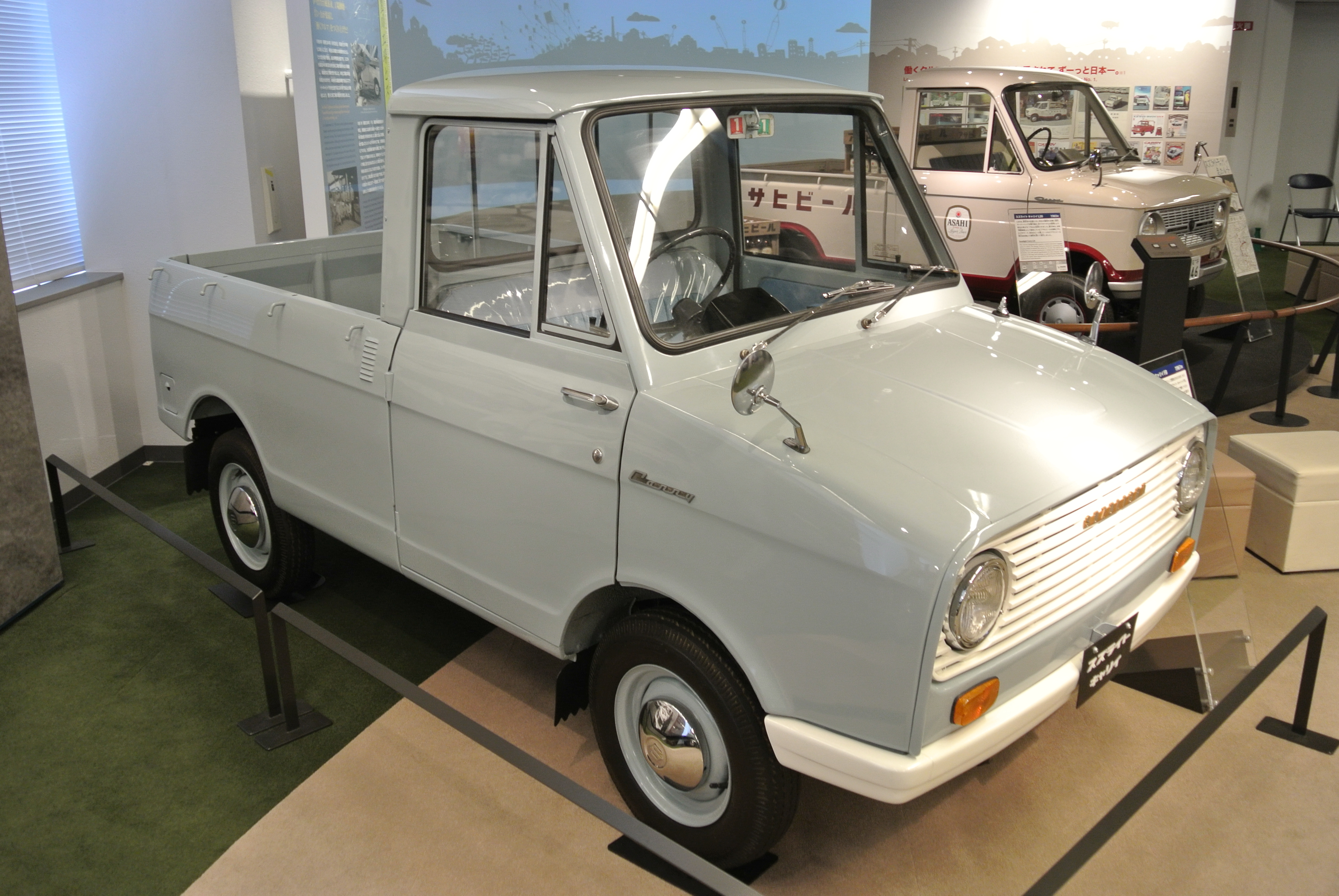
Suzulight Carry truck (FB)

== Second generation (L20; 1965) ==
Second generation (L20)
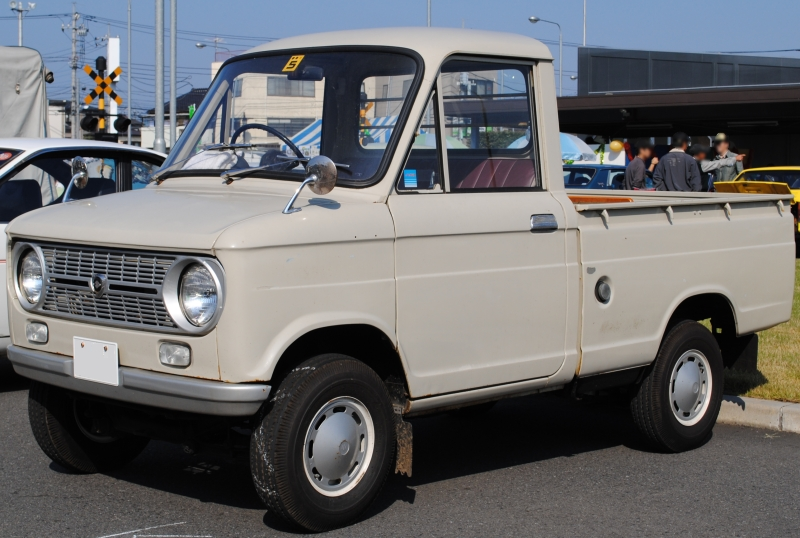
- 1965–1969 Suzulight Carry truck (L20)

Overview
- Also called: Suzulight Carry
- Production: 1965–1969
- Assembly: Japan: Toyokawa, Aichi; Iwata, Shizuoka

Body and chassis
- Body style: 2-door pickup 4-door van
- Layout: FMR layout

Powertrain
- Engine: 359 cc FB two-stroke I2

In June 1965, the rebodied L20 Suzulight Carry replaced the FB. The ladder-frame chassis was modified, now with independently sprung front wheels (by torsion bars). While output remained 21 hp, the engine benefitted from Suzuki's patented Cylinder Crank Injection lubrication system. The Carry Van was replaced by the new L20V in January 1966, and there was also a dropside pickup (L21). Finally, the L20H, a pickup with a canvas canopy and a rear-facing seat placed in the bed, providing seating for four, was offered. Top speed for the second generation was down to 75 km/h. The Carry Van had a horizontally divided, two-piece tailgate, and sliding rear windows.

Production of this more traditional version continued in parallel with the cabover L30 Carry, ending only with the 1969 introduction of the L40. Output shifted from Toyokawa to Iwata with the opening of the new plant in August 1967.

== Third generation (L30/L31; 1966) ==
Third generation (L30/L31)
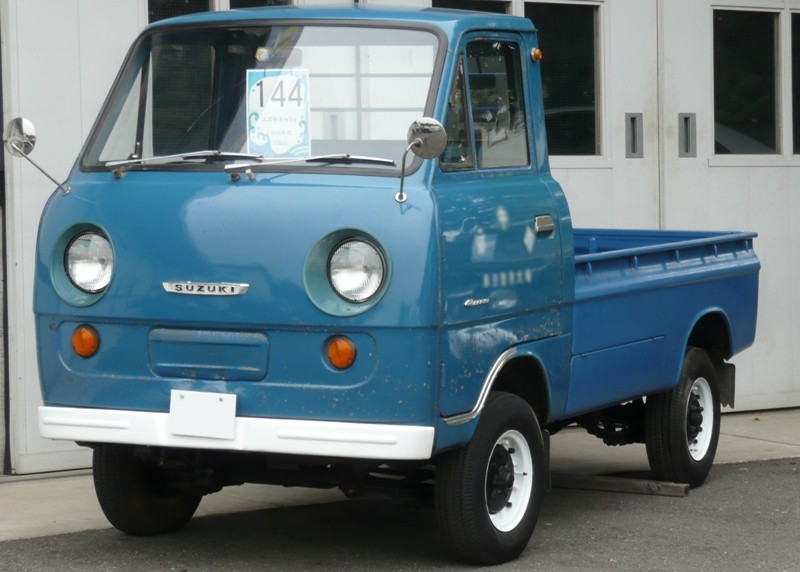
- 1966–1969 Suzuki Carry truck (L30)

Overview
- Production: 1966–1969
- Assembly: Japan: Toyokawa, Aichi; Iwata, Shizuoka

Body and chassis
- Body style: 4-door van 2-door pickup
- Layout: FMR layout

Powertrain
- Engine: 359 cc FB two-stroke I2

The new L30 Suzuki Carry (the "Suzulight" label was being retired) is a full cabover design, with the same FB engine mounted horizontally underneath the load area. The starter and generator were combined and mounted directly on the front of the crankshaft. Introduced in February 1966, the L30 was built alongside its more traditional predecessor until they were both replaced by the L40. A canopied L30H, similar to the L20H, but with the seats in the bed facing each other, was available from the start. Also, an L31, with a drop-side bed, was available. Performance and mechanics were very similar to its bonneted sister, but the load area was considerably larger. Maximum load capacity was still 350 kg (770 lb).

A short-lived Carry Van version of the L30 ("L30V") was not introduced until March 1968, but offered four doors and a two-piece tailgate (top and bottom). Bodywork was the same ahead of the B-pillar. Output shifted from Toyokawa to Iwata with the opening of the new plant in August 1967.

== Fourth generation (L40/L41; 1969) ==
Fourth generation (L40/L41)
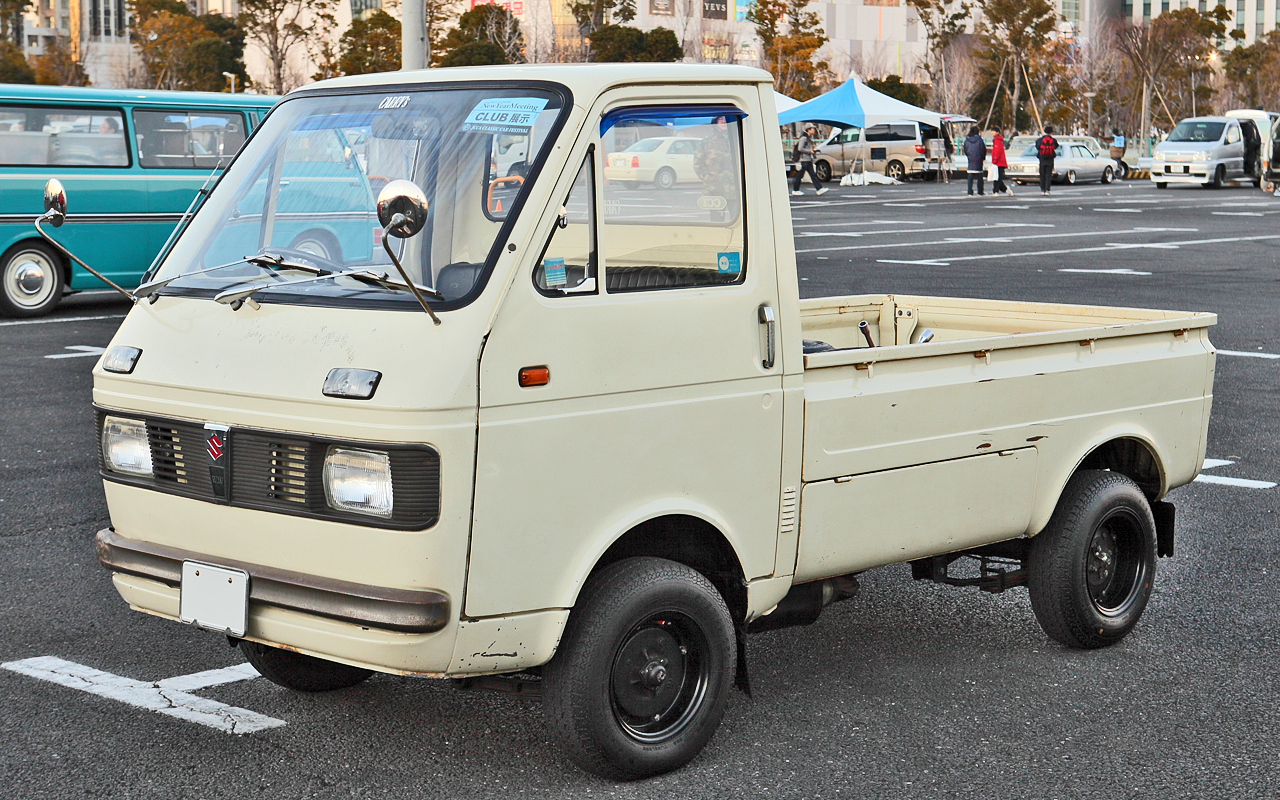
- 1969–1972 Suzuki Carry truck (L40)

Overview
- Production: 1969–1972
- Assembly: Japan: Iwata, Shizuoka
- Designer: Giorgetto Giugiaro at Italdesign

Body and chassis
- Body style: 5-door van 2-door pickup
- Layout: FMR layout

Powertrain
- Engine: 359 cc FB two-stroke I2

Dimensions
- Wheelbase: 1,745 mm (68.7 in)

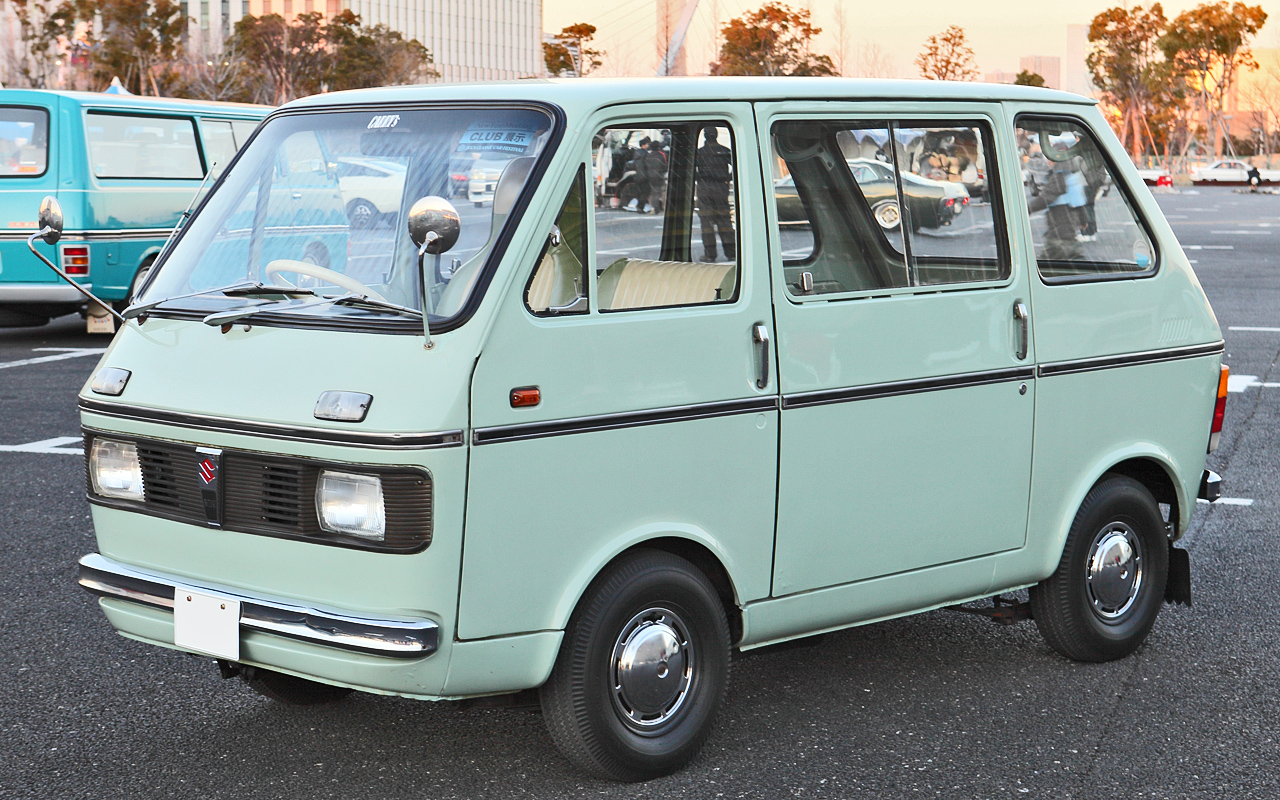

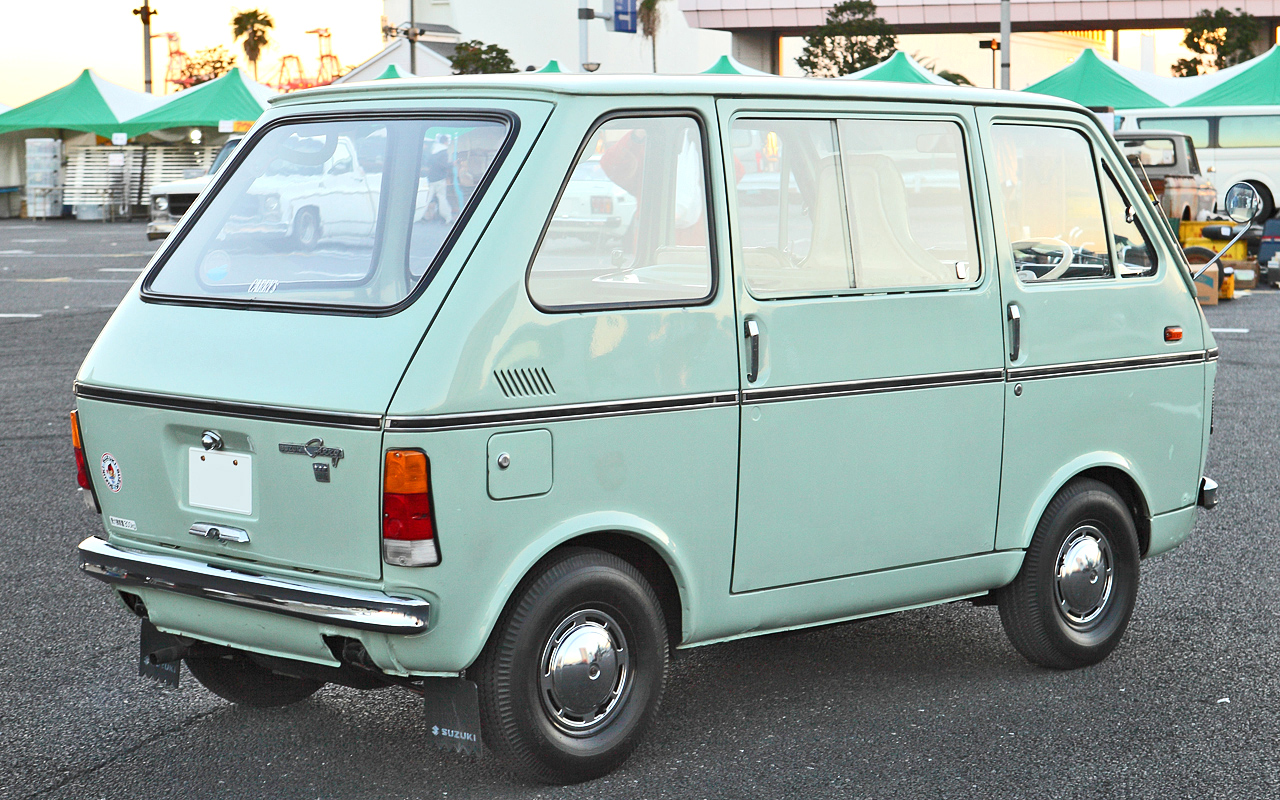
1969–1972 Suzuki Carry van (L40)

In July 1969, the Giugiaro-designed L40 Carry was introduced. In November of the same year, a van version with two opening side doors and a top-hinged rear gate was added. Giugiaro's design was more obvious in the Carry Van iteration, very symmetrical with similar looks to the front and rear. The L40's design was not overly utilitarian, limiting interior space and being a bit too modern for the usually very orthodox Japanese commercial customer base. The L40 did benefit, though, from an updated, 25 PS (18 kW) reed valve version of the now venerable FB engine. It was marketed as "Fast Carry" (韋駄天キャリイ, Idaten Kyarī) in Japan, because of its rakish design and less workmanlike nature. Dimensions, dictated by kei jidosha regulations, remained 2,990 mm × 1,295 mm (117.7 in × 51.0 in) and 359 cc (21.9 cu in). Maximum load was 350 kg (772 lb) for the truck and 300 kg (661 lb) for the van versions. Top speed increased considerably to 95 km/h (59 mph).

As part of a minor facelift in April 1971, the Carry received a 27 PS (20 kW) – still at 6,000 rpm – version of the well-known FB engine, featuring Suzuki's Cylinder Crank Injection and Selmix lubrication system. This engine also found its way into the recently introduced LJ10 Jimny. Torque was 3.7 kg⋅m (36 N⋅m; 27 lb⋅ft) at 5,000 rpm. The Panel Van version has a boxy unit mounted on the rear of a Carry truck chassis. In 1971, a V40FC Camper version of the Van was also added. The Camper could accommodate two adults and two children and included canvas beds, curtains in the rear windows, and a table for the rear seat.

While the truck versions were replaced in May 1972, the L40V continued for another three months before an L50 Van took its place. In all, about 233,000 examples were built in the very short, not quite three-year production run. The Carry truck outsold the van by a factor of around 8 to 1.

== Fifth generation (L50/L60; 1972) ==
Fifth generation (L50/L60)
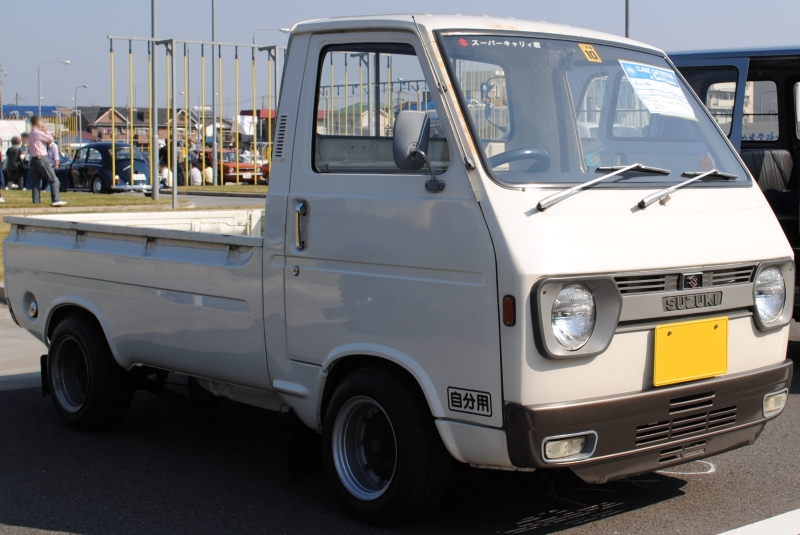
- 1975–1976 Suzuki Carry truck (L50, facelift)

Overview
- Production: 1972–1976
- Assembly: Japan: Iwata, Shizuoka

Body and chassis
- Body style: 5-door van 2-door pickup
- Layout: FMR layout

Powertrain
- Engine: 359 cc L50 two-stroke I2; 596 cc L60 two-stroke I2

The fifth-generation L50 Carry truck debuted in May 1972, followed by a new Carry van in August. The new model echoes Giugiaro's design, but without ventilation windows in the front doors and with a more traditional appearance. Headlights are now round, while the van version receives a more square rear body and with a sliding rear side door. The engine is a water-cooled design (L50), otherwise similar to the previous engine, but now with 28 hp (21 kW). Maximum load was back up to 350 kg (770 lb).

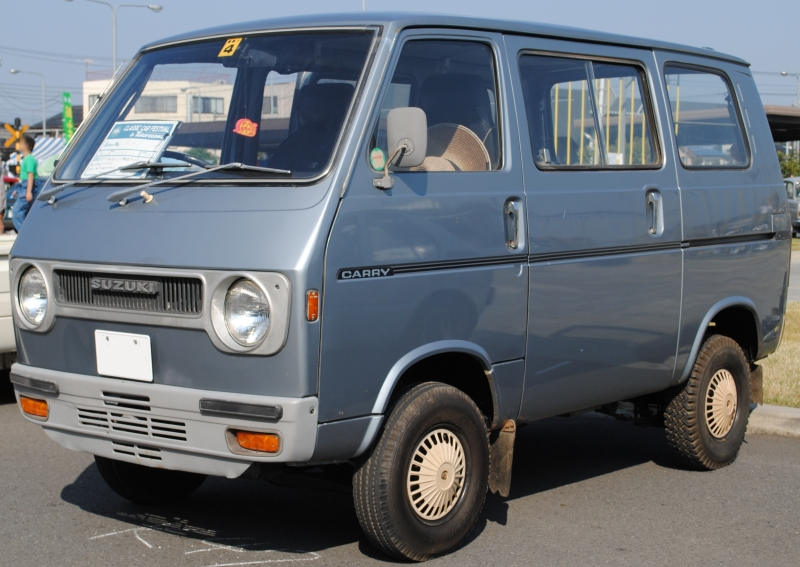

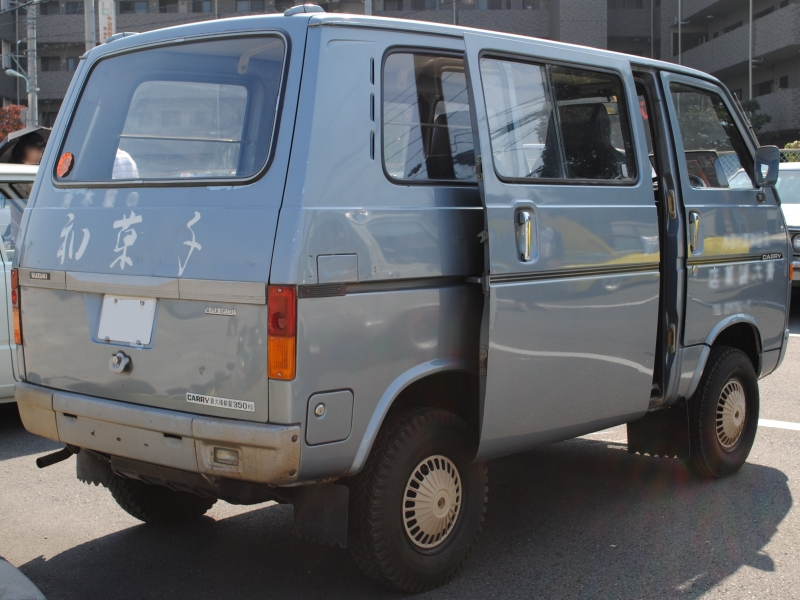
1972–1973 Suzuki Carry Super DeLuxe van (L50VF)

In December 1972, a five-door van (L50VF, with sliding side doors) was added. Three months later, the dropside L51 went on sale. In November 1973, the Carry underwent a minor facelift, receiving a new grille and modified front bumper. The interior was also updated, with a new dashboard and finally hanging gas and clutch pedals. The fifth-generation Carry led Suzuki to great market success, with Suzuki selling more kei trucks than all others during 1973 and 1974.

In September 1975, a special export version was introduced, aimed at customers who wanted more loading ability. The new L60 series received a larger, 446-cc (also L60) version of the L50 two-cylinder, 29 PS (as opposed to 26 for export market 360-cc models), a stronger differential "to transmit the generous torque" and sturdier springs meant load capacity increased to 550 kg (1,210 lb). For 1975, the Carry received minor changes allowing for the fitment of new larger license plates. In December 1975, the domestic market L50s' engine lost two horsepower (down to 26) in the effort of fulfilling new, stricter emissions standards.

== Sixth generation (ST10/ST20/ST80; 1976) ==
Sixth generation (ST10/ST20/ST80)
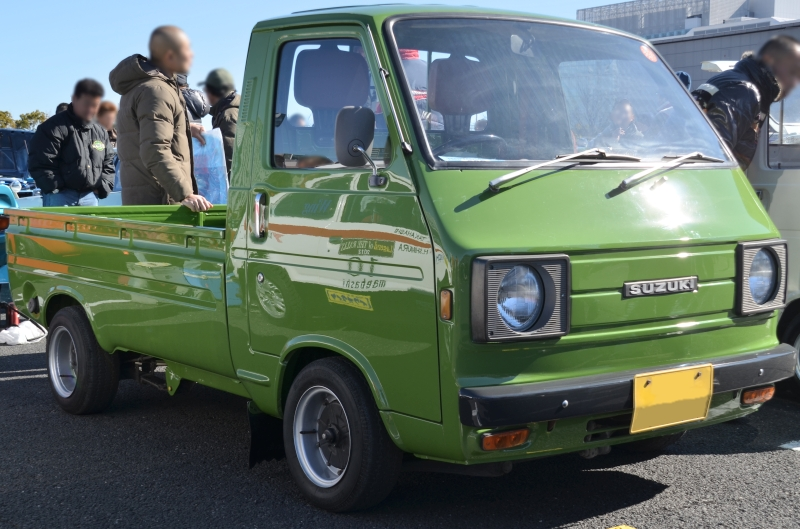
- Suzuki Carry truck (ST20)

Overview
- Also called: Jilin JL 110C/E (China)
- Production: 1976–1979; 1977–1983 (Indonesia)
- Assembly: Japan: Iwata, Shizuoka; Indonesia: Jakarta (PT Indohero)

Body and chassis
- Body style: 4-door van 2-door pickup
- Layout: FMR layout

Powertrain
- Engine: 539 cc LJ50 two-stroke I3; 797 cc F8A I4

Dimensions
- Wheelbase: 1,745 mm (68.7 in) (ST10); 1,840 mm (72.4 in) (ST20)
- Length: 3,035 mm (119.5 in) (ST10); 3,155 mm (124.2 in) (ST20V); 3,195 mm (125.8 in) (ST20 truck)
- Width: 1,295 mm (51.0 in) (ST10); 1,395 mm (54.9 in) (ST20)

In May 1976, responding to changed standards for the kei class, Suzuki released the Carry 55, chassis code ST10/ST10V. It had the larger, water-cooled but still two-stroke three-cylinder LJ50 engine of 539 cc but was otherwise hard to distinguish from the preceding L50 series. The only two differences in appearance were bigger (albeit slimmer) bumpers, which no longer enveloped the bottom of the front, as well as slightly altered doors with a slight bump in the swage line to accommodate the door handle. There was also an ST11 version with a drop-side bed (sometimes called ST10S). The ST10 (along with the LC20 Fronte) was the first Suzuki to enter CKD production in Indonesia, in 1976. The engine in export models produces 30 PS (22 kW), enough for a claimed top speed of 105 km/h (65 mph). In 1977, it was replaced by the larger ST20 in Indonesian production.

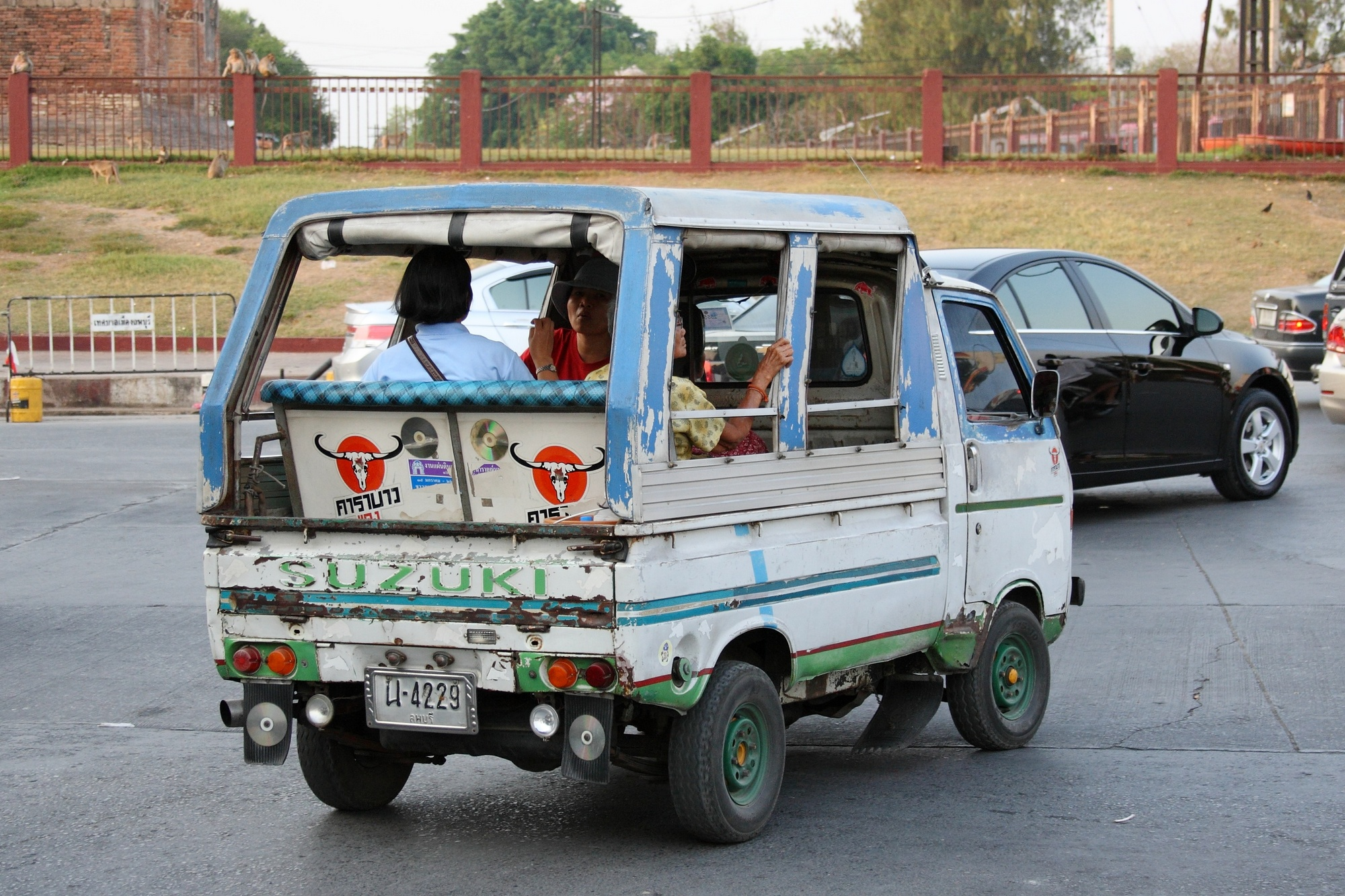
Suzuki Carry ST20 used as a songthaew, rear view

After only four months, in September 1976, the interim ST10 was gradually replaced by the widened and lengthened ST20 pickup version, which also has a longer wheelbase. Marketed as the Suzuki Carry Wide 550, it now reached the maximum dimensions set for the class. In November, the ST20 Van arrived - this version was 4 cm (1.6 in) shorter than the truck as it reused the shorter rear side bodypanels of the L50 and ST10 versions. Some special variants of the ST10 (such as refrigerated versions, panel vans, etcetera) remained on sale alongside the ST20 for a little while longer until new versions could be developed and old stock be sold out. There was also an ST20K model available: the "K" refers to the "trucklike" nature of the vehicle in that it had three drop-sides as opposed to the utility version which had only a tailgate and formed sides. The ST20 range retained the three-cylinder 539-cc two-stroke engine of the ST10 and has a carrying capacity of 350 kg (772 lb). Maximum power remained 26 PS (19 kW) at 4500 rpm for Japanese-market vehicles. In October 1977, after about 187,000 had been built, the ST20 underwent a light facelift, with increased equipment and all versions (excepting the base truck) now featuring a front grille.

Equipment levels were base, Standard, and Super Deluxe. The base version has no front grille, the Standard has a black grille, while the Super Deluxe features chrome trim on the grille and chromed hubcaps. By October 1977, the Custom Van was available in the Japanese market. Well equipped, with metallic paint, reclining fabric-covered seats, and chrome bumpers, this was aimed squarely at use as a private car. This heralded the development of the future "Every" range of passenger microvans.

By 1977, the export-only ST80 appeared - this version was the first Carry to be equipped with a four-stroke engine, the inline-four, 797-cc F8A as recently introduced in the LJ80 Jimny. In the Carry, however, the engine only developed 37 hp (28 kW; 38 PS) at 5500 rpm. The ST20 Carry was also produced in Indonesia until at least 1983, where it was nicknamed "Turungtung" (or Truntung). This is an onomatopoetic word for the sound made by the Carry's two-stroke engine. The Carry was the first Suzuki product to be built in Indonesia, where it saw extensive use as an Angkot. The ST20 was only offered as a truck in Indonesia, but local body builders such as Adi Putro and Liling Putra came up with multi-seat taxi bodies and other variations. The Indonesian ST20 has a claimed 33 PS (24 kW) at 4500 rpm and 52 N⋅m (38 lb⋅ft) of torque at 3000 rpm, being unaffected by emissions regulations.

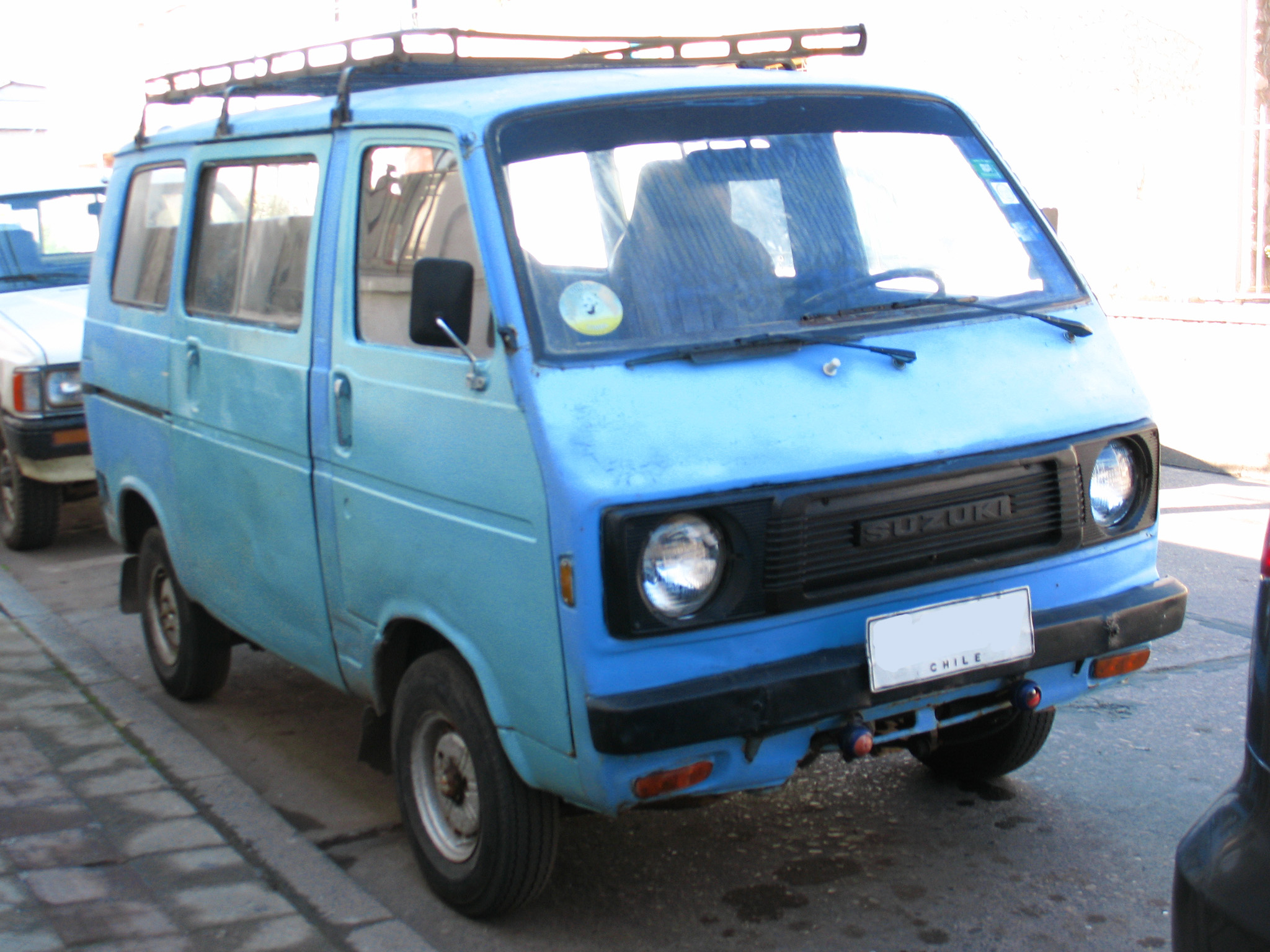
ST80V facelift version (Chile). This style of grille appeared in October 1977.

== Seventh generation (ST30/ST40/ST90/ST100; 1979) ==
Seventh generation (ST30/ST40/ST90/ST100)
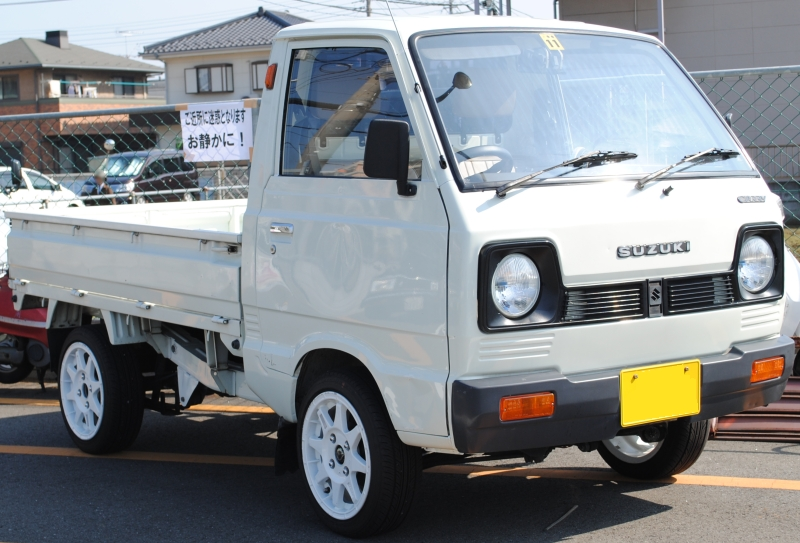
- 1979–1985 Suzuki Carry truck (ST40)

Overview
- Also called: Suzuki Every (passenger van); Suzuki Bolan (van, Pakistan); Suzuki Ravi (pick-up, Pakistan); Ford Pronto (Taiwan); Maruti Omni (India); Chang'an SC6320G/SC1010X/5010XJC/5010XKC (van, China); Chang'an SC1011CS (pick-up truck, China) Changhe CH730/CH110X/CH1010/CH6320 (van; China); Changhe CH1010F/CH1011/CH1012/CH1014 (pick-up truck, China); Hanjiang SFJ1011/SFJ1012 (pick-up truck, China); Hanjiang SFJ 6320/6322/6323 (van, China)
- Production: 1979–1985; 1979–2024 (Pakistan); 1982–2000 (China; Changhe); 1983–2009 (Indonesia); 1984–2019 (India); 1990–1999 (Chang'an); 1993–2003 (China; Hanjiang)
- Assembly: Japan: Iwata, Shizuoka; China: Chongqing (Chang'an); Hanzhong (Hanjiang); Jingdezhen (Changhe); India: Gurgaon; Indonesia: Bekasi; New Zealand: Whanganui (South Pacific Suzuki); Pakistan: Karachi; Taiwan: Chung Li (Ford Lio Ho)

Body and chassis
- Body style: 5-door van 2-door pickup
- Layout: Front mid-engine, rear-wheel-drive or four-wheel-drive

Powertrain
- Engine: 539 cc LJ50 two-stroke I3; 543 cc F5A I3; 796 cc F8B I3; 797 cc F8A I4; 970 cc F10A I4; China: These engine are based on F10A engine 797 cc DA462Q/462D I4 (Hanjiang SFJ1012A); 797 cc HH462QE I4 (Hanjiang SFJ1012B); 797 cc YH462QE1 I4 (Hanjiang SFJ1012C); 970 cc I3 (Chang'an SC6320G); 970 cc DA465Q/465D I4 (Hanjiang SFJ1011A); 1050 cc HH465Q-1E I4 (Hanjiang SFJ1011B)
- Transmission: 4/5 speed manual

Dimensions
- Wheelbase: 1,840 mm (72 in); 1,940 mm (76 in) (Indonesia); 1,990 mm (78 in) (Hanjiang 1012 models)
- Length: 3,195 mm (125.8 in); 3,530 mm (139 in) (Indonesia); 3,555–3,655 mm (140.0–143.9 in) (Hanjiang models)
- Width: 1,395 mm (54.9 in); 1,465 mm (57.7 in) (Indonesia)
- Height: 1,625–1,900 mm (64.0–74.8 in); 1,720 mm (68 in) (Indonesia); 1,735–1,835 mm (68.3–72.2 in) (Hanjiang models)
- Curb weight: 585–785 kg (1,290–1,731 lb)

In March 1979, the new ST30 series arrived. The dimensions remained the same as before, as did the two-stroke engine, although it was moved forward and now resided underneath the front seat. At the time of the ST30's introduction, the Carry had been the bestselling Kei truck in the Japanese domestic market for eight straight years. For export markets, the ST90 version was equipped with the larger four-stroke F8A engine of 797 cc, entering production in August 1979. In October 1980, the domestic market Carry became available with the new 543 cc four-stroke F5A engine (ST40), although the torquey two-stroke engine remained popular. Later, export models were also fitted with the 970 cc four-cylinder engine; they received the ST100 chassis codes.

In December 1982, the Van portion of the Carry range became separated in the Japanese domestic market and was now sold as the Suzuki Every.

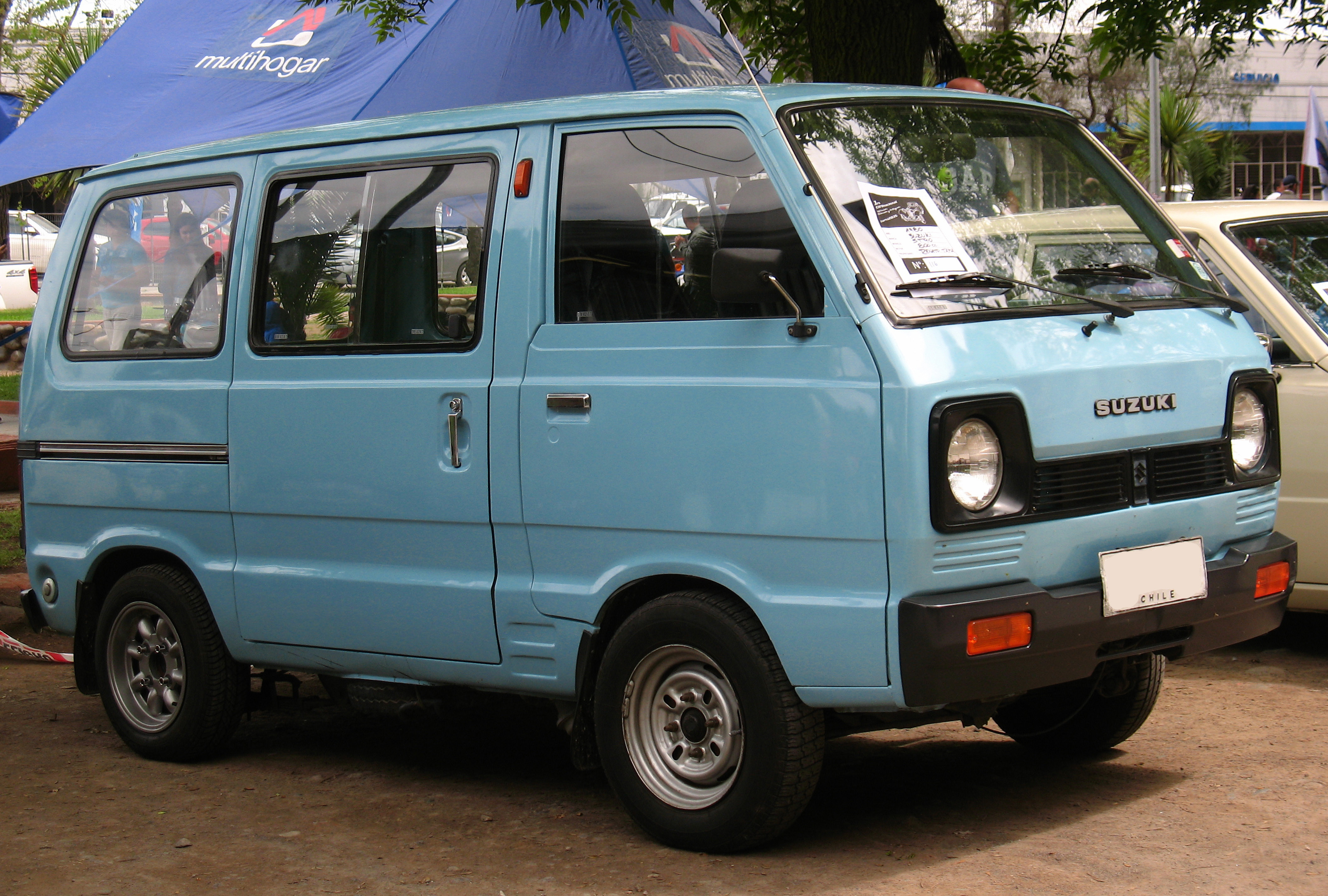
1980 Suzuki Carry van (ST90)

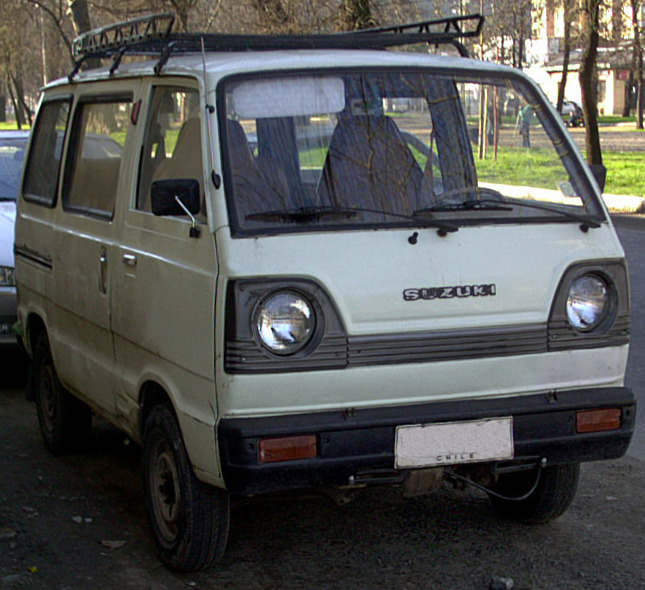
1982–1985 Suzuki Carry van (ST41)

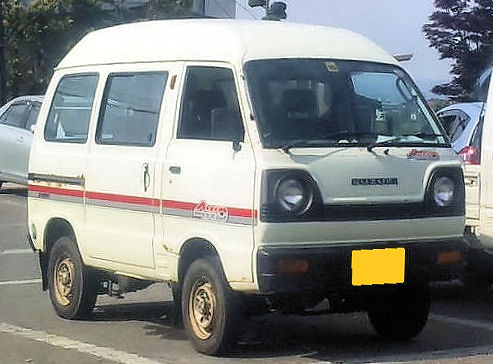
1982–1985 Suzuki Every 4WD (ST41)

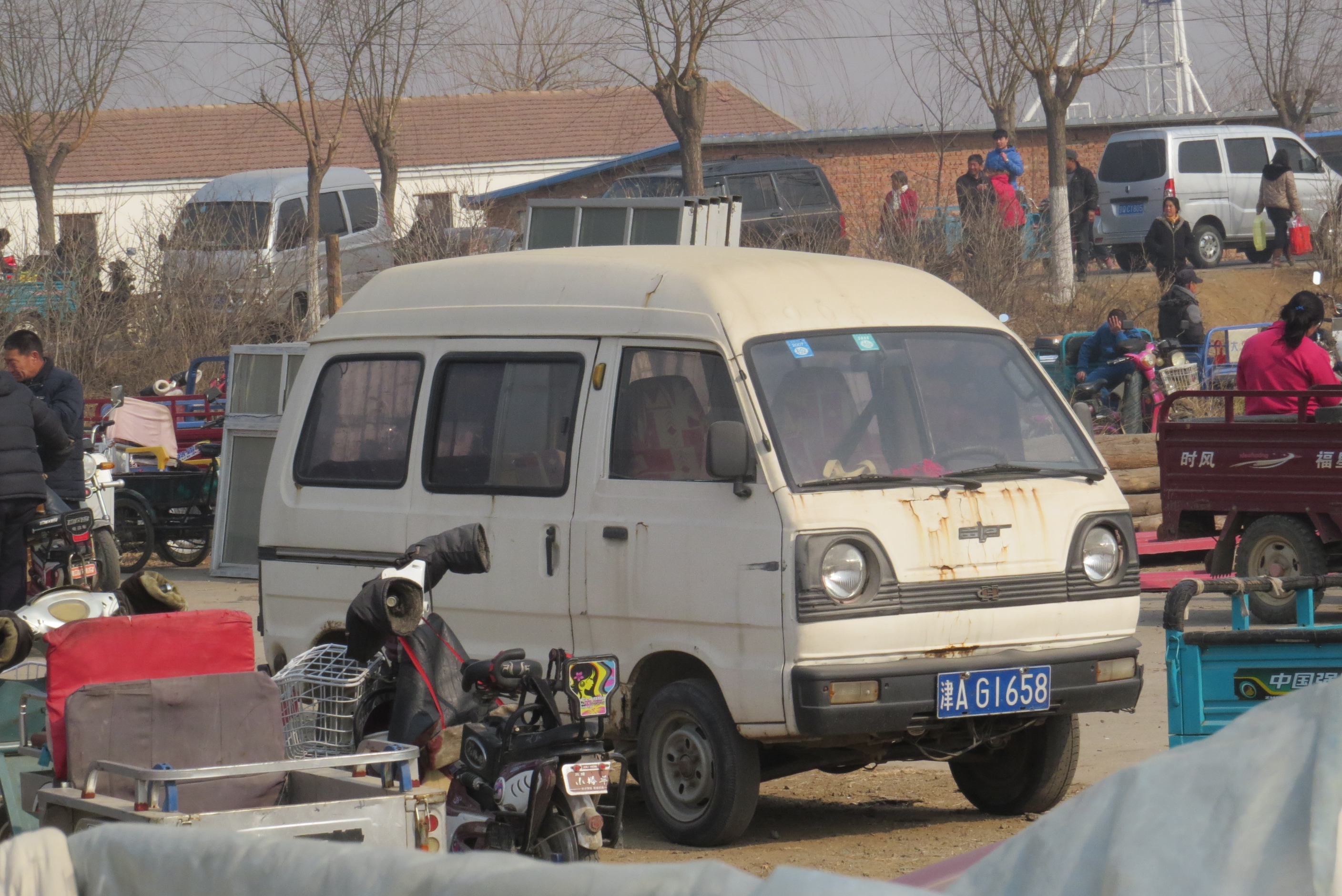
1982–2000 Changhe CH6320
(uses Suzuki's ST90 chassis)

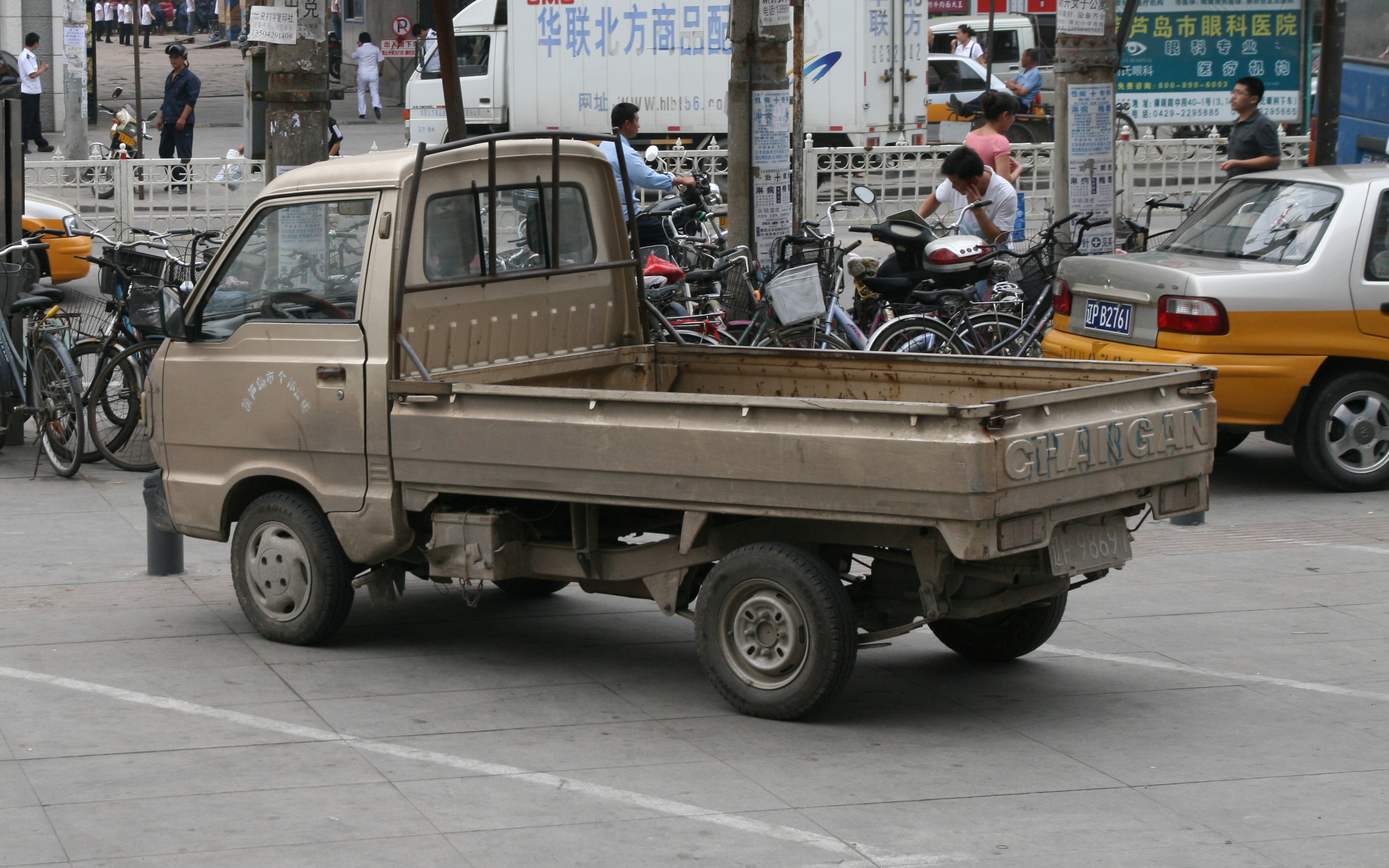
Chang'an SC1011

=== Export models ===
==== China ====
Changhe was the first manufacturer to produce minivans and pick-up trucks in China; they assembled 151,629 units of the Carry.

==== Pakistan ====
In Pakistan, Pak Suzuki Motors, an affiliate of the Suzuki Motor Corporation, assembled and distributed the ST90V-based Suzuki Bolan till 2024. It kept the three-cylinder F8B 796 cc engine, with outputs of 27–29 kW (36–39 hp; 37–39 PS) depending on if they were carburetted or fuel injected, and around 62 N⋅m (46 lb⋅ft) of torque. As of February 2024, it is available in three versions: The Euro II, VX and VXR. The better-equipped VXR and Euro II have factory-fitted air conditioning. The four-speed manual transmission allows for a top speed of 120 km/h (75 mph). There is also a pickup version, called the Suzuki Ravi.

The Suzuki Bolan sold 220,790 units from 2007 until 2018, broken down as follows:

Sales by year

Year	Units Sold
1 June 2007	10,451
1 June 2008	▲15,566
1 June 2009	▲17,209
1 June 2010	▼8,664
1 June 2011	▲11,439
1 June 2012	▲13,311
1 June 2013	▲22,540
1 June 2014	▼12,941
1 June 2015	▲14,088
1 June 2016	▲23,582
1 June 2017	▼19,245
1 June 2018	▲21,738

==== Taiwan ====
The original Ford Pronto was a rebadged Carry ST80, a nameplate which was offered between 1985 and 2007 by Ford Lio Ho, a joint venture between Ford and Lio Ho in Taiwan. The Pronto was only available in the Taiwanese market, where it was introduced specifically to compete with China Motor Corporation's Mitsubishi Minicab and Sanfu's Subaru Sambar in the local minivan market. The original revised front end was designed in Australia by an independent design firm. The first generation Pronto had the same, 797-cc four-cylinder engine as export market Suzuki Carrys received.

==== Indonesia ====
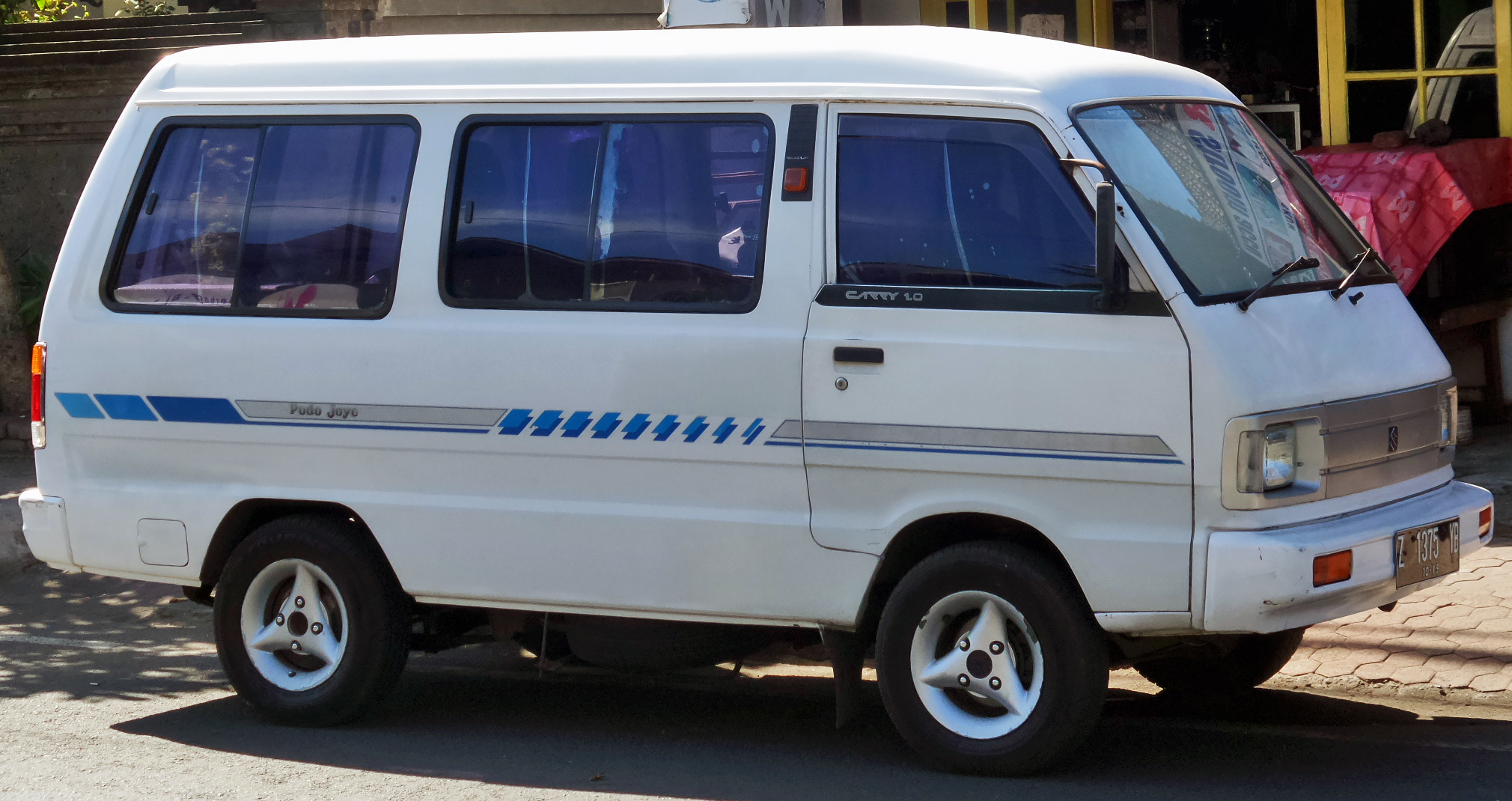
Suzuki Carry 1.0 (ST100) minibus, coachbuilt by Podo Joyo

In Indonesia, the seventh generation Carry and Super Carry were assembled by Suzuki Indomobil Motor beginning in 1983, fitted with the well-known 970 cc F10A engine with 50 PS (37 kW). This carried the ST100 model code, and was also available as a minivan. Thanks to a locally developed rear body with a longer overhang and a wheelbase extended by 10 cm (3.9 in), it was about 20 cm (7.9 in) longer than the Carrys sold elsewhere, which allowed a third row of seats to be fitted. Unlike other markets, the minivan version did not equipped with sliding doors and lift up tailgate.

In 1986, it was updated with a new half-trapezium front headlight, but only lasted for less than six months and was replaced again with square headlights by the end of 1986 (until the end of production in 2009) with new front and larger bumpers; this model was originally sold as the "Super Carry Extra". This model, available as a van or truck, reached 3,530 mm (139.0 in) in overall length and is 1,465 mm (57.7 in) wide. These dimensions remained true until the end of Carry 1.0 production in Indonesia. Unlike most markets, Indonesian Carry trucks could legally seat three people. In 1989 the Super Carry received a five-speed transmission, as well as a tachometer. In April 1995, Suzuki equipped the Carry Extra with power steering, as well as the redesigned steering wheel with Suzuki S logo. The Suzuki Carry Extra shares the same steering wheel as the Suzuki Katana GX and the Suzuki Futura.

Late in the model's life, the engine was updated to meet the Euro 2 emissions standards, which took effect in Indonesia in 2007. This meant that the old F10A engine was updated with multi-point fuel injection in 2005 and a catalytic converter, increasing power to 60 PS (44 kW). Although removed from the regular price lists in 2006, this version of the Carry was still built to special order until 2009, alongside the larger Carry Futura (based on the eighth generation Carry). Until 1987, when surpassed by the Daihatsu Zebra and Toyota Kijang, the Carry was Indonesia's best selling vehicle.

The seventh generation Carrys in Indonesia, alongside the eighth generation Carry Futura, are widely used as transportation minibuses known locally as "angkot".

==== India ====
Maruti Suzuki Omni
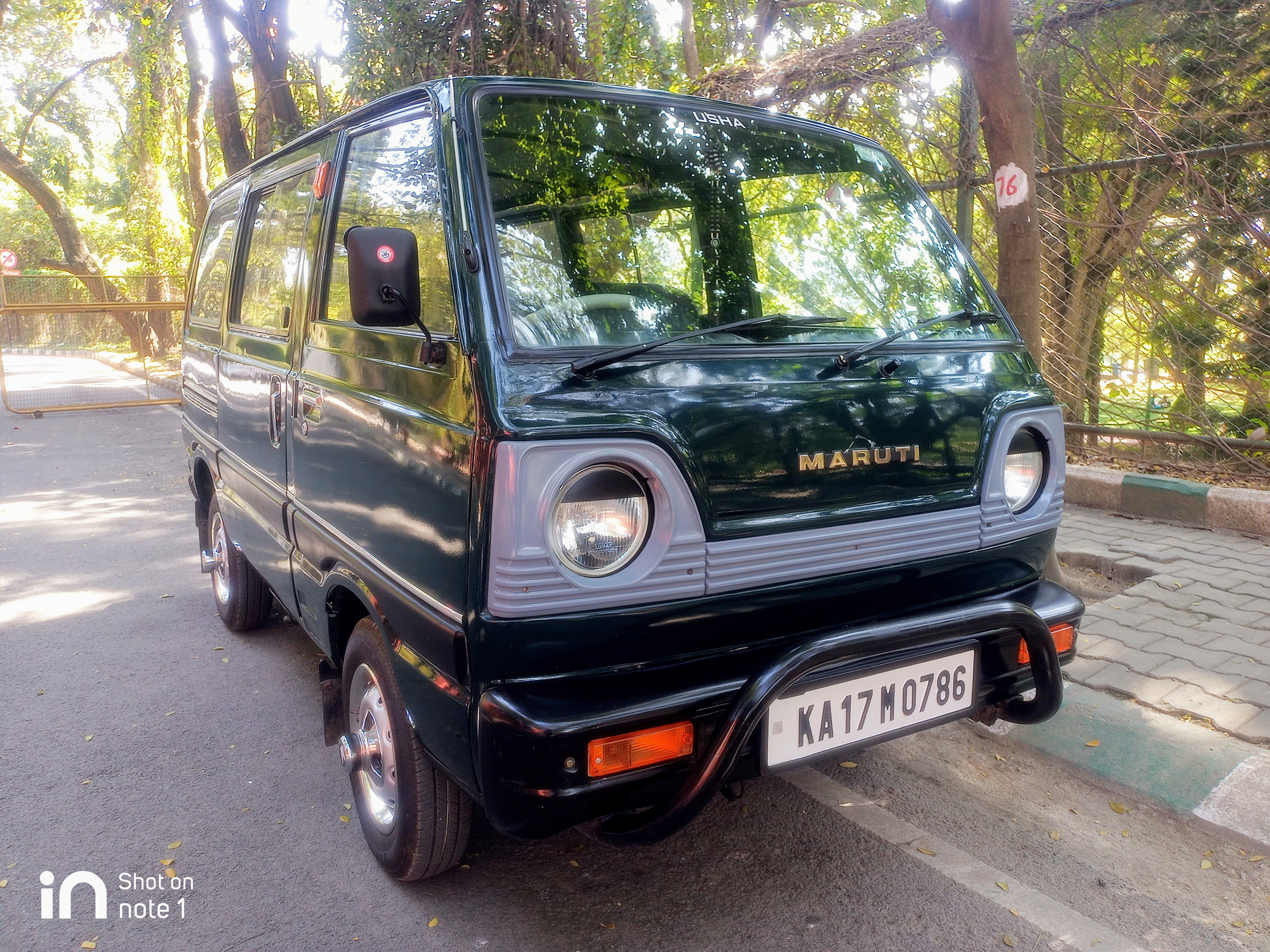
- The first generation Maruti Suzuki Omni

Overview
- Manufacturer: Maruti Suzuki
- Also called: Maruti Van
- Production: 1984–2019
- Assembly: Gurgaon, India

Body and chassis
- Class: Microvan
- Body style: 4-door van
- Layout: FMR layout

Powertrain
- Engine: 797 cc F8B I3
- Transmission: 4-speed manual

Dimensions
- Wheelbase: 1,840 mm (72.4 in)
- Length: 3,370 mm (132.7 in)
- Width: 1,410 mm (55.5 in)
- Height: 1,640 mm (64.6 in)
- Curb weight: 785 kg (1,731 lb)

Chronology
- Successor: Maruti Suzuki Versa/Eeco

The Maruti Suzuki Omni is a microvan manufactured by Suzuki's Indian subsidiary Maruti Suzuki. The first version of Maruti Suzuki Omni had a 796 cc (49 cu in) inline-three engine, same as the Maruti 800 city car. Sold simply as the Maruti Suzuki Van, this was the second vehicle to be launched by Maruti Suzuki. It arrived one year after the 800, in 1984. The name was changed to "Omni" in 1988. It received a facelift in 1998, and further minor revisions in 2005, when improvements were made to the exterior and the interior, and new colours became available. Later version of the Omni includes the:

- Omni (E), released in 1996, an 8-seater microbus version of the Omni
- Omni XL - 1999, as the Omni E but with a higher roof.
- Omni Cargo LPG - 2004, created to answer the growing popularity of this car being used as an inter-city cargo vehicle.
- Omni LPG - 2003, same 796 cc engine, added with a factory fitted LPG Kit, authorised by the Indian RTOs (Regional Transport Offices). This makes it the most economic four-wheeler in India, as far as driving costs are concerned.
- Omni Ambulance - A Omni E, designed for ambulance usage. This is the most common type of ambulances found in Indian cities.
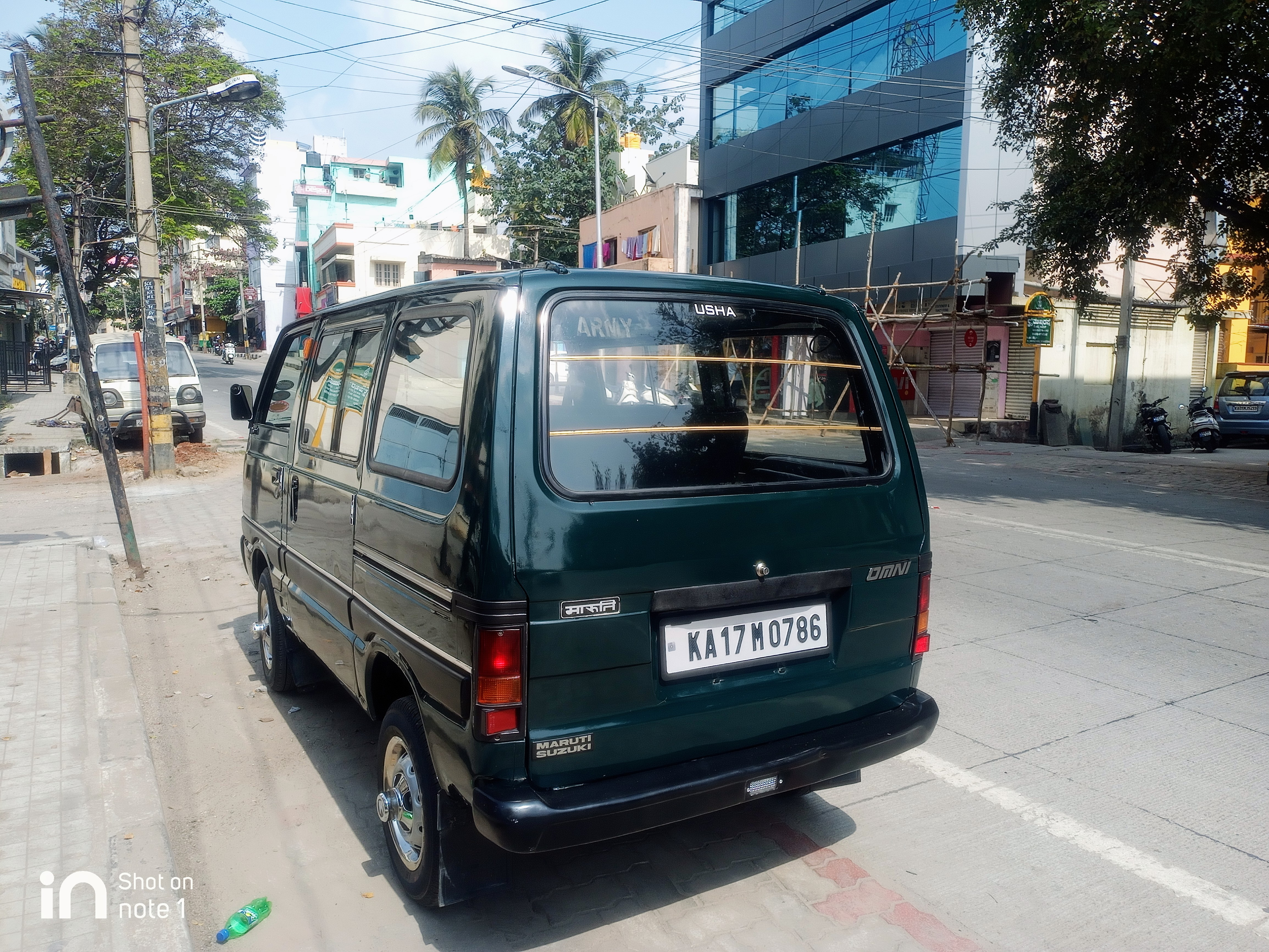
Rear of a first generation Maruti Suzuki Omni

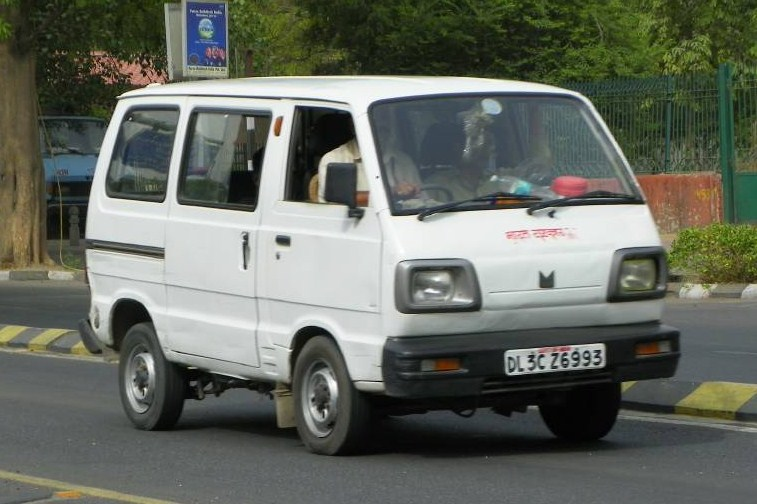
1st Facelift in 1998 (India)

The Omni could be divided into two categories: the family version and the cargo version. The newer family version has two extra seats directly behind the front seating and facing away towards the rear of the van making it an eight seater. Older versions are modified by individual owners to add additional capacity this way. The cargo version is completely devoid of back seats. Both versions have sliding back doors and a top-hinged tailgate.

The Omni (E) has the following official specifications (2010):

Name	Vehicle specifications
Max. speed:	100 km/h (62 mph)
Initial acceleration:	0-60 km/h (37 mph) in 10 seconds
Fuel:	Petrol
Fuel consumption in city:	13–14 km/L (7.7–7.1 L/100 km)
Fuel consumption on highways:	16–17 km/L (6.3–5.9 L/100 km)
Power:	37 bhp (28 kW) at 5,000 rpm
Construction:	Cast iron
Displacement:	796 cc
Ignition:	Multipoint fuel injection
Layout:	3-cylinder in-line
Max. torque:	62 N⋅m (46 ft⋅lbf) at 3,000 rpm
Valve train:	2 valves per cylinder
Transmission:	Manual- 4-speed
Front suspension:	MacPherson strut with gas filled shock absorbers
Rear suspension:	Leaf spring with shock absorbers
Front brakes:	Disc
Rear brakes:	Drum
Tyres:	145 R-12 LT 6PR (radial)

The initial versions were so basic that the interior dashboard even lacked a fan blower opening as a standard.

In April 2019, Maruti Suzuki announced they would discontinue the Omni after 35 years of production. The Omni was not able to meet India's updated safety and emission standards implemented the same month, which requires new vehicles to have a driver's airbag, antilock brakes, seatbelt reminders, speed warning beeps and rear parking sensors. The flat front of the Omni also prevented the addition of crumple zones. Its replacement is the Eeco.

==== South Africa ====
For this market, the Carry was available as truck, van and high roof van, all powered by 797cc F8A four cylinder engine. The car is popularly called "half loafs", referring to "half a loaf of bread" (still a staple of many South Africans). In Cape Town and Durban, many of these little vans are seen painted in bright yellow with green artwork and a chopped-off open rear end. These are part of large fleets of privately owned public transport vehicles which fit between normal taxis and city buses. Customers literally hop on the back, and pass the driver a rand or two, and simply jump off at their destination.

== Eighth generation (DA71/DB71/DA81/DA41/DB41/DA51/DB51; 1985) ==
Eighth generation (DA71/DB71/DA81/DA41/DB41/DA51/DB51)
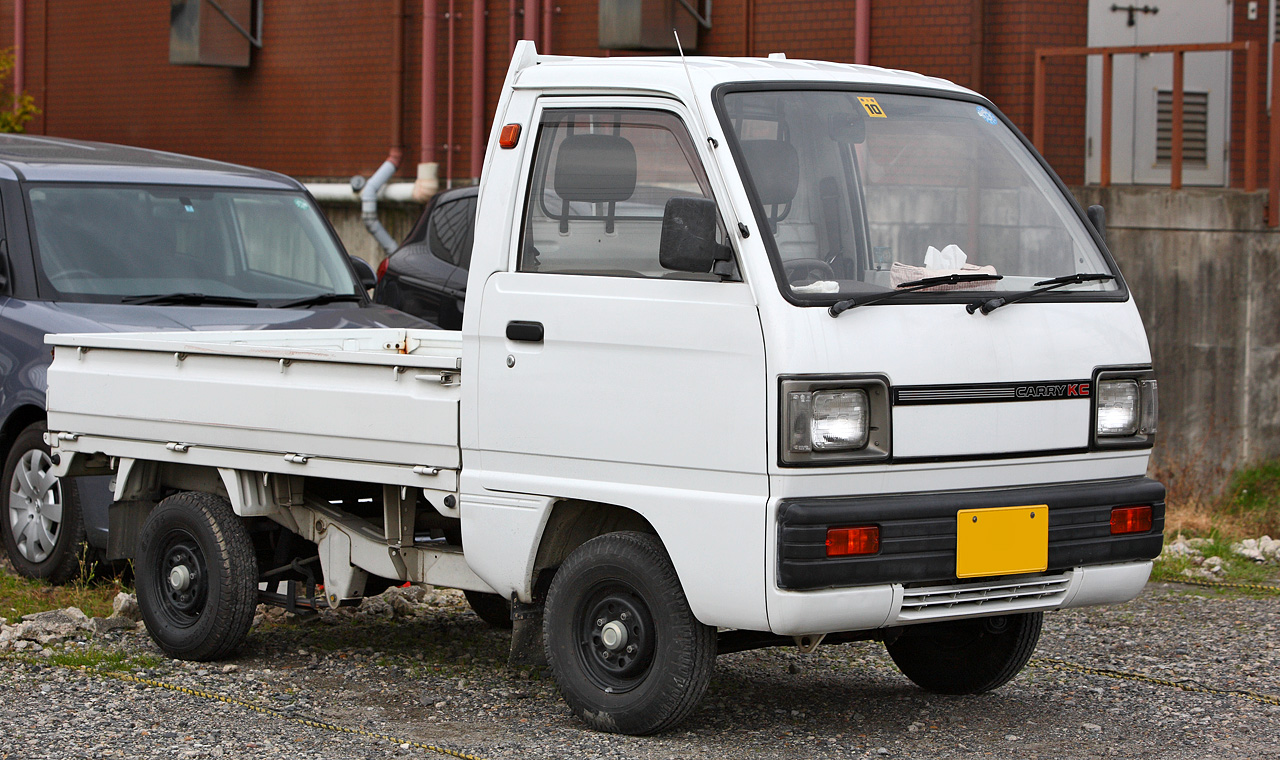
- 1985–1989 Suzuki Carry truck (DA71T)

Overview
- Also called: Suzuki Every; Suzuki Super Carry; Autozam Scrum (Japan); Bedford Rascal (United Kingdom); Vauxhall Rascal (United Kingdom); GME Rascal (Europe); Changhe Changlingwang/ Junma; Chevrolet CMV/CMP (Central America); Daewoo Damas/Labo (South Korea); Holden Scurry (Australia); Hafei Songhuajiang HFJ6350 (China); Chang'an SC6330 (China); ZAP Truck XL (United States); Suzuki Bravo (Philippines); Ford Pronto (Taiwan)
- Production: 1985–1991 (Japan); 1986–1993 (England); 1995–1999 (China); 1991–2021 (South Korea); 2000–2019 (Vietnam)
- Assembly: Japan: Iwata, Shizuoka (Iwata Plant); South Korea: Changwon (GM Korea); Vietnam: Bien Hoa, Dong Nai, (Vietnam Suzuki Corp); United Kingdom: Luton (Vauxhall Luton)

Body and chassis
- Body style: 2-door pickup 5-door van/microbus
- Layout: Front mid-engine, rear-wheel-drive or four-wheel-drive

Powertrain
- Engine: 539 cc LJ50 two-stroke I3 (DA81); 543 cc F5A I3 (DA/DB71); 547 cc F5B I3 (DA/DB41); 657 cc F6A I3 (DA/DB51); 797 cc F8A I4 (SK408); 970 cc F10A I4 (SK410)
- Transmission: 4/5-speed manual 3-speed automatic

Dimensions
- Wheelbase: 1,840 mm (72 in)
- Length: 3,175 or 3,275 mm (125 or 129 in) (truck); 3,195 or 3,295 mm (126 or 130 in) (van)
- Width: 1,395–1,475 mm (55–58 in)
- Height: 1,675–1,800 mm (66–71 in)
- Curb weight: 600–780 kg (1,323–1,720 lb)

The eighth generation Carry appeared in March 1985. It was modernized and the range again expanded, with a more powerful fuel injected engine available on top. The chassis codes became quite confusing, with DA/DB71 used for the F5A engined model (DB signifying four-wheel drive) and DA81 for the two-stroke truck which remained available until the Carry underwent a facelift in July 1986. T, B, and V suffixes were used to denote trucks, trucks with tip decks, and vans. Beginning in late 1987, a 52 PS (38 kW) turbocharged engine was available in the Every, while the Carry truck received a three-valve, supercharged version of the F5A engine with 48 PS (35 kW). There was also a short-lived nine-valve version with 32 PS (24 kW) available for better equipped versions of the Every; the regular six-valve version had to make do with 30 PS (22 kW). In May 1989 the more modern multi-valve F5B engine entered the lineup; it received the DA/DB41 chassis code and replaced most of the F5A engines. This new engine also became available in the badge-engineered Autozam Scrum, sold by Mazda (DG/DH41).

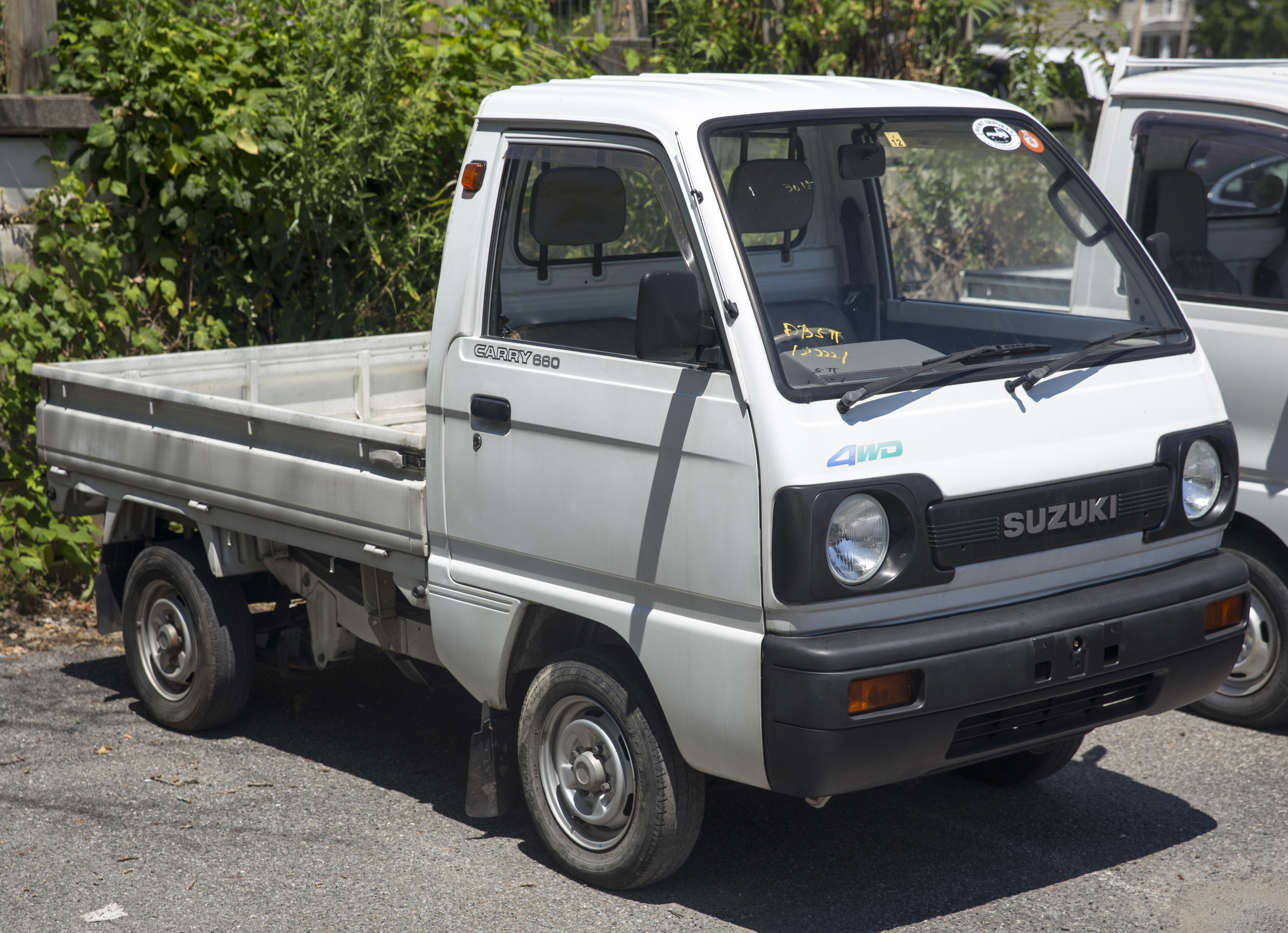
1990–1991 facelifted Suzuki Carry truck (DB51T)

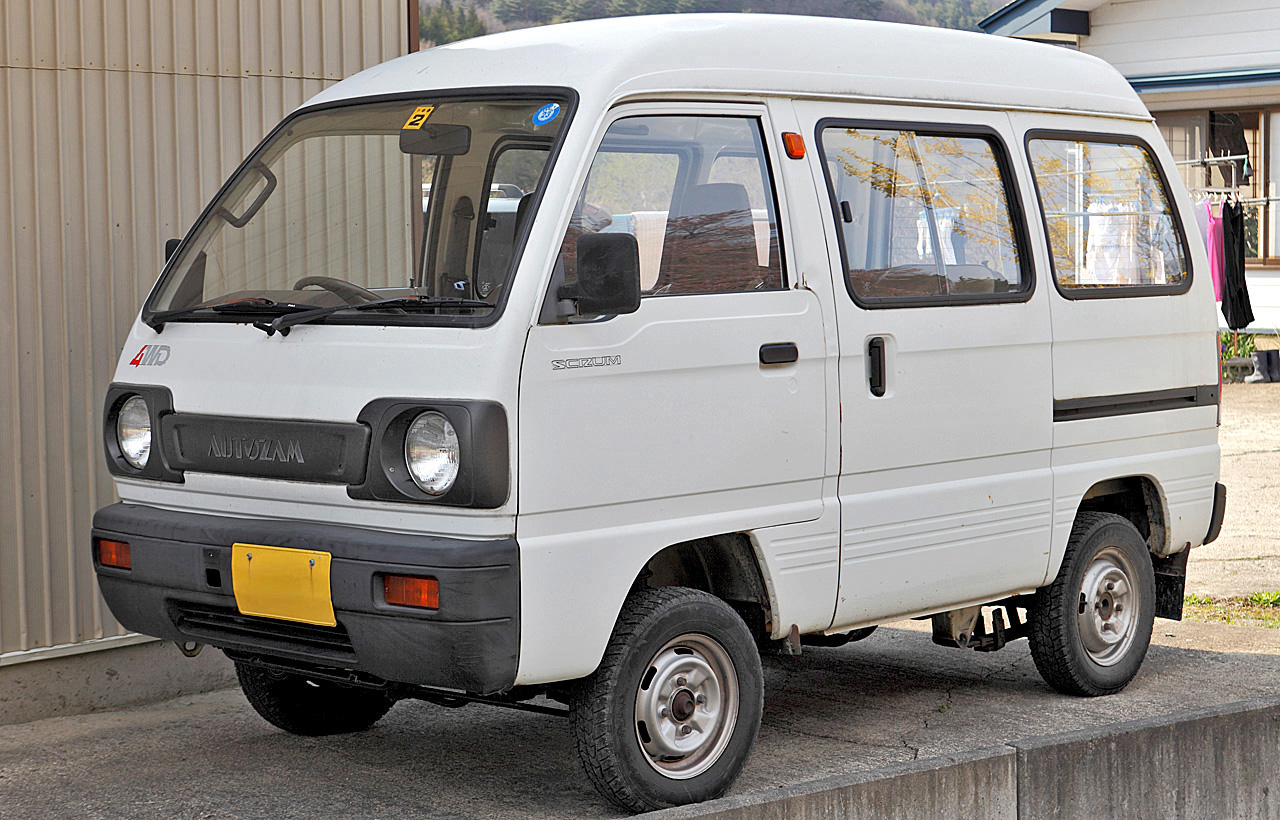
1990–1991 Autozam Scrum van (DG41; first generation)

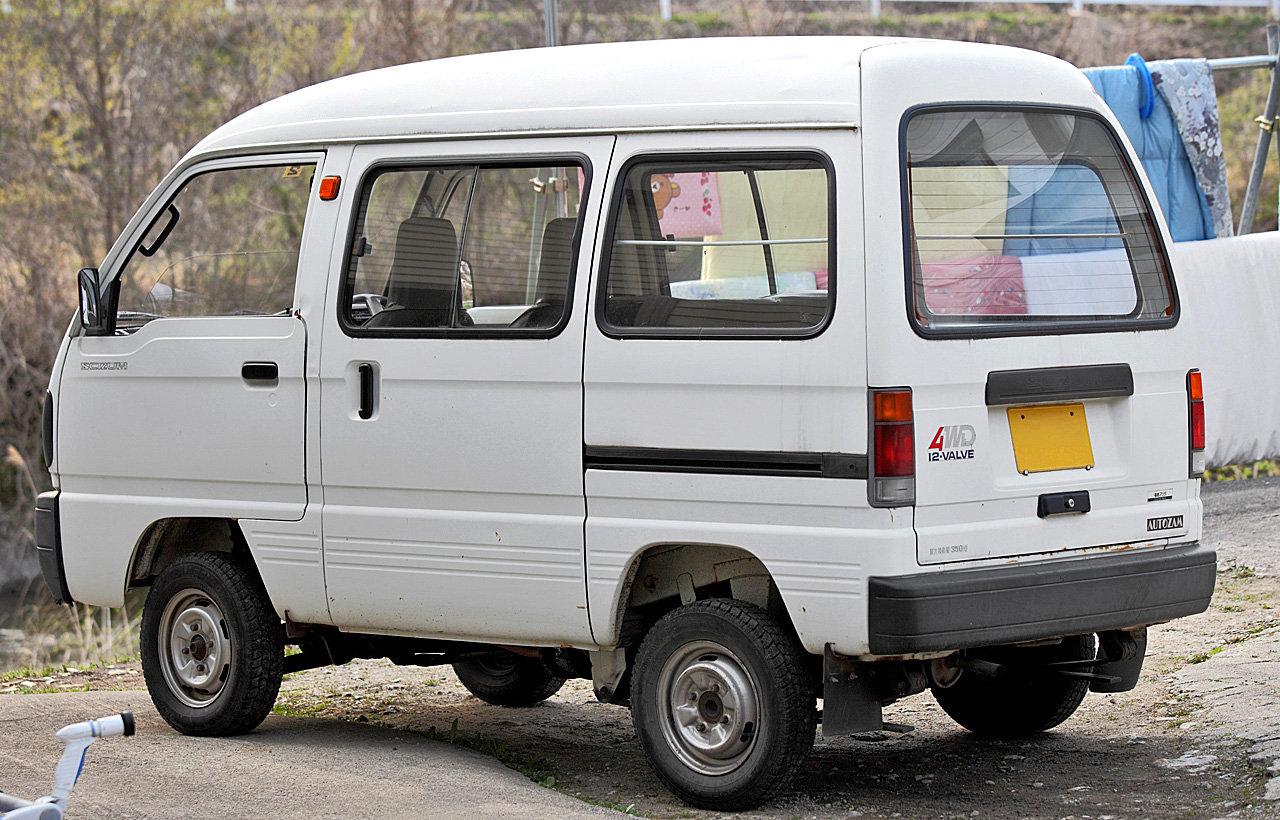
1990–1991 Autozam Scrum van (DG41; first generation)

=== Facelift ===
With the rules regarding the size and engines of kei-cars being altered for March 1990, Suzuki had to update the Carry and Every which now carried the DA/DB51 chassis code. The larger 657 cc F6A engine provided somewhat more power, ranging from 38 to 58 PS (28 to 43 kW), and new more rounded bodywork provided a more modern look. The least powerful engine received an upgrade in the passenger-oriented Every models in September 1990, increasing output to 42 PS (31 kW) at 5500 rpm while torque went up from 5.3 to 5.8 kg⋅m (52 to 57 N⋅m; 38 to 42 lb⋅ft) at 4000 rpm. This engine became standard fitment for the lower end Carrys as well in March 1991, but only six months later the DA/DB51 was replaced by the reshelled ninth generation Carry and Every.

=== Export models ===
Post-1985 European market Carrys still used the 797 cc four-cylinder F8A familiar from the ST90 Carry, while Super Carrys were equipped with the F10A 970 cc four. Chassis codes are SK408 and SK410, while power outputs are 37 and 45 respectively PS (27 and 33 kW), top speeds 110 and 115 km/h. Heftier bumpers meant overall length was up 10 cm, for a total of 3295 mm. Production of export models began in July 1985. The SK408 (sometimes called the DA11) was discontinued in October 1989. The SK410 Super Carrys (DA21) received the same F10a 970cc inline-four as fitted to the SJ410 Samurai. In much of Europe, this generation of the Carry was also sold as the Bedford, Vauxhall, or GME Rascal. These were built at the GM plant in Luton, to circumvent JAMA's voluntary export restrictions.

In Australia, this model was sold as both the Super Carry (in ute, van, or wagon form) and as the Holden Scurry, which was not available as a "ute". In Australia, the Scurry was designated as the NB series.

In Taiwan, the Carry continued to be available as the Ford Pronto, originally with the F8A engine although later this was changed to the F10A, corresponding to the SK408 and SK410 models. It remained in production until 1999, when it was replaced by a rebadged version of the tenth generation Carry.

In Central America, this model was available as the Chevrolet CMV (van) and CMP (pickup) and was produced until 2013.

The Super Carry continues in production in Vietnam for local markets, as a truck or panel van, with a Euro 2 emissions compliant engine. The 970 cc engine has electronic fuel injection and develops 31 kW (42 PS) at 5500 rpm. The 3,240 mm (128 in) long truck is the best selling truck in Vietnam and the engine was updated to meet the Euro 4 emissions standards in 2017.

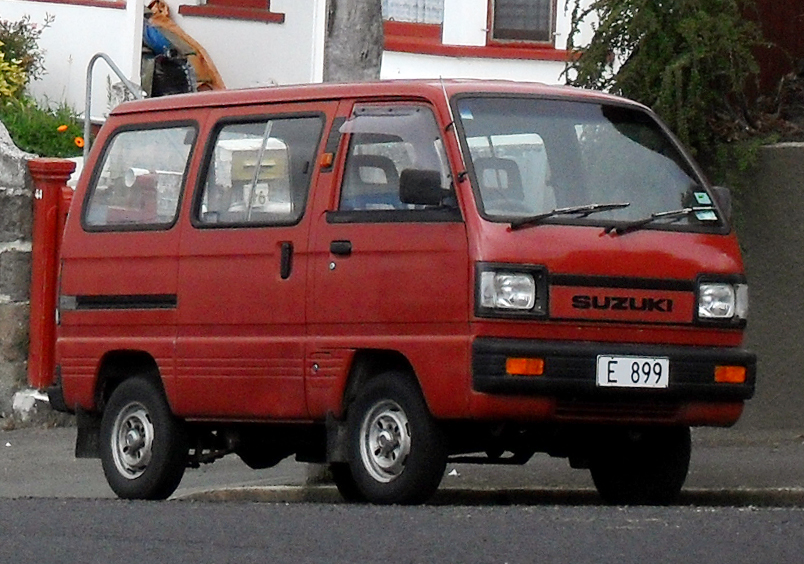
Suzuki Carry van (SK410)

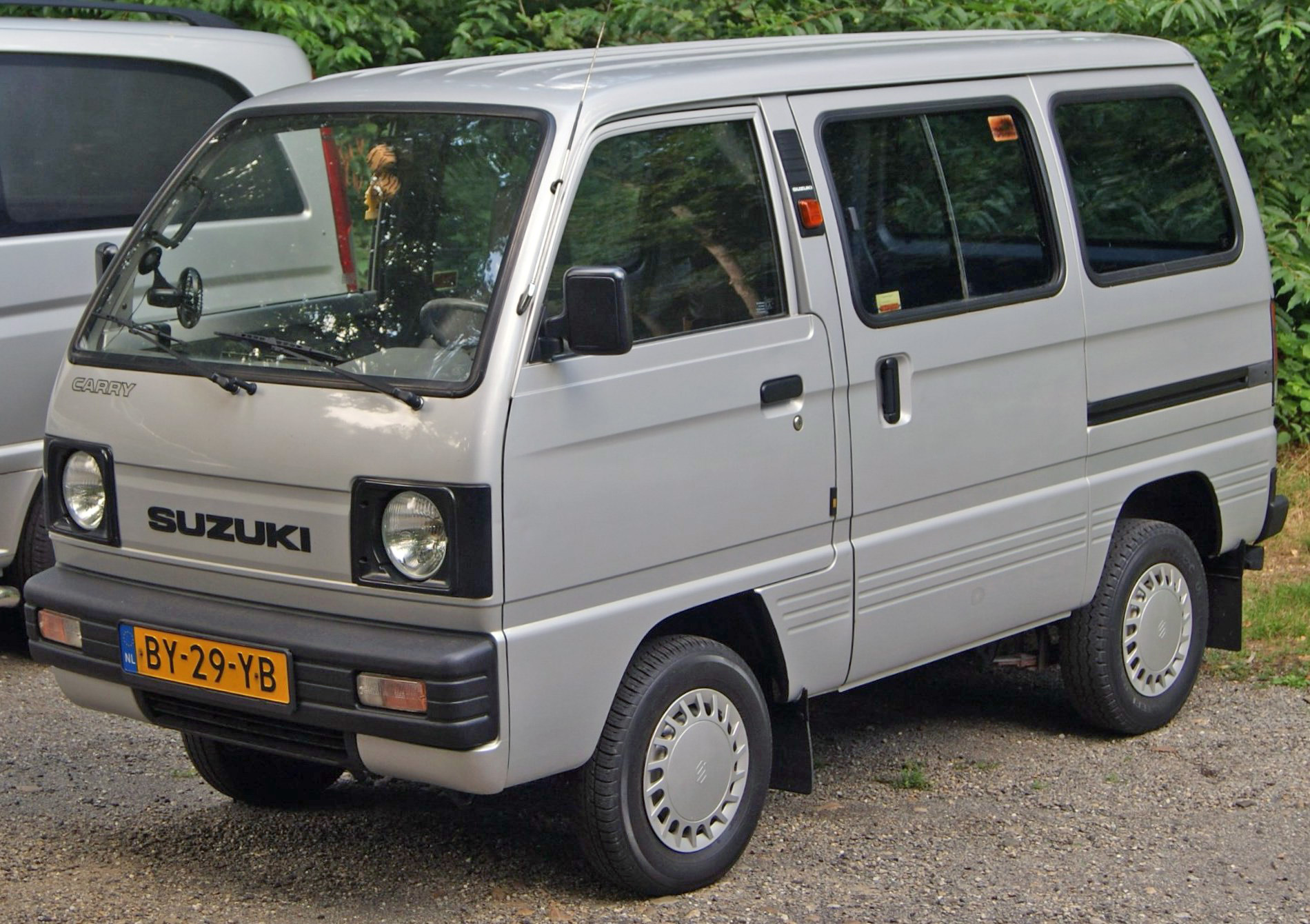
1987 Suzuki Carry van (Netherlands)

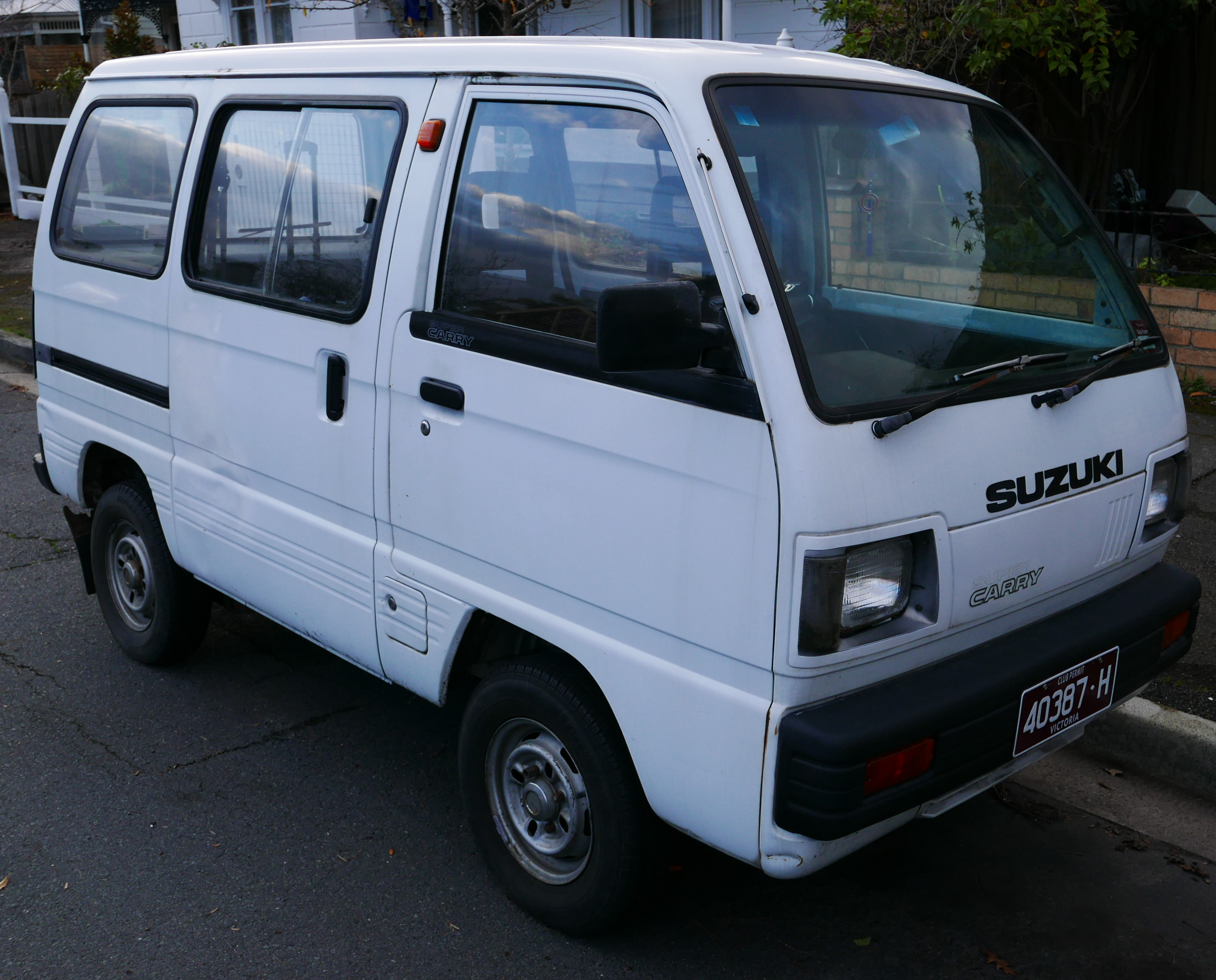
1988–1990 Suzuki Super Carry TX van (SK410, Australia)

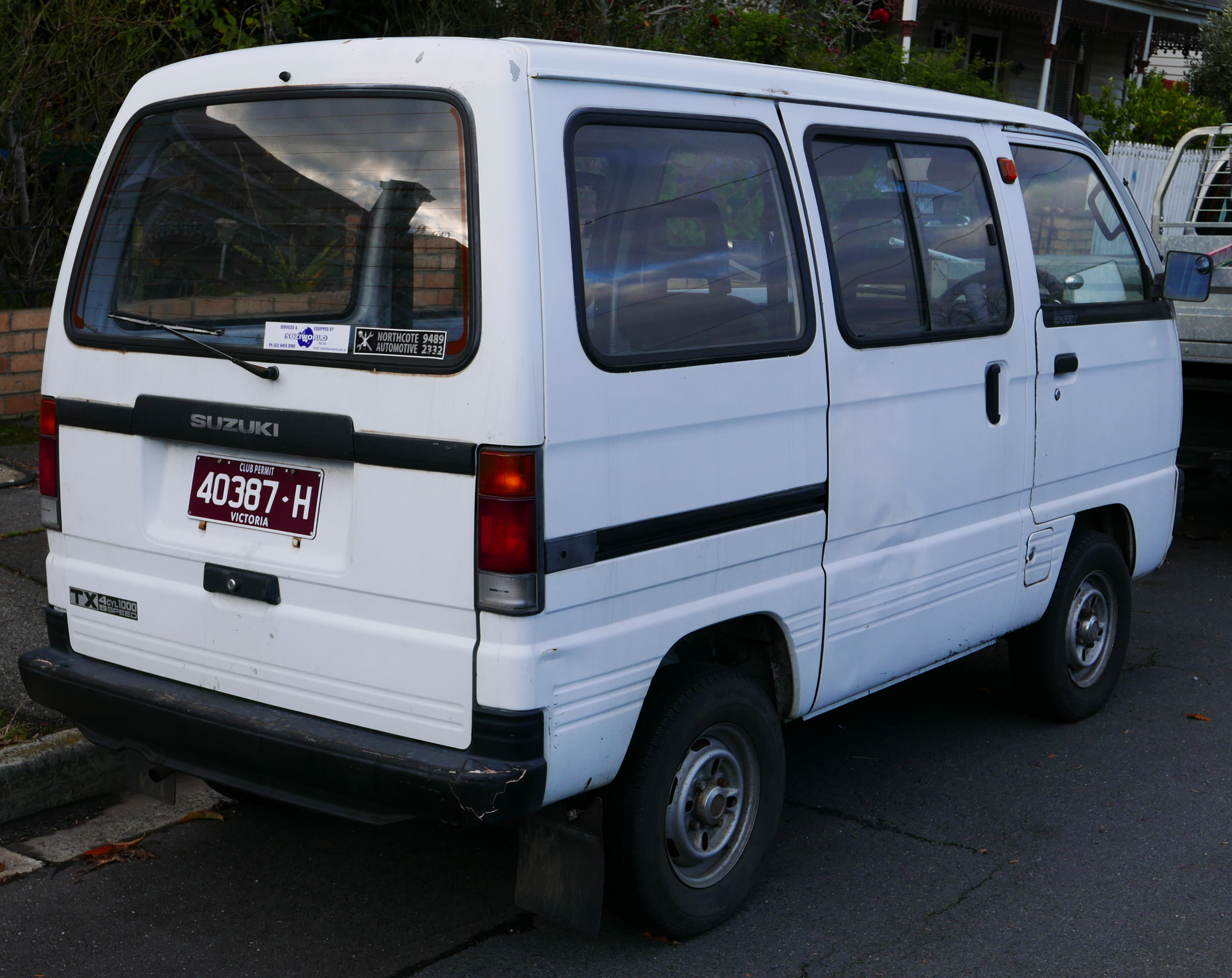
1988–1990 Suzuki Super Carry TX van (SK410, Australia)

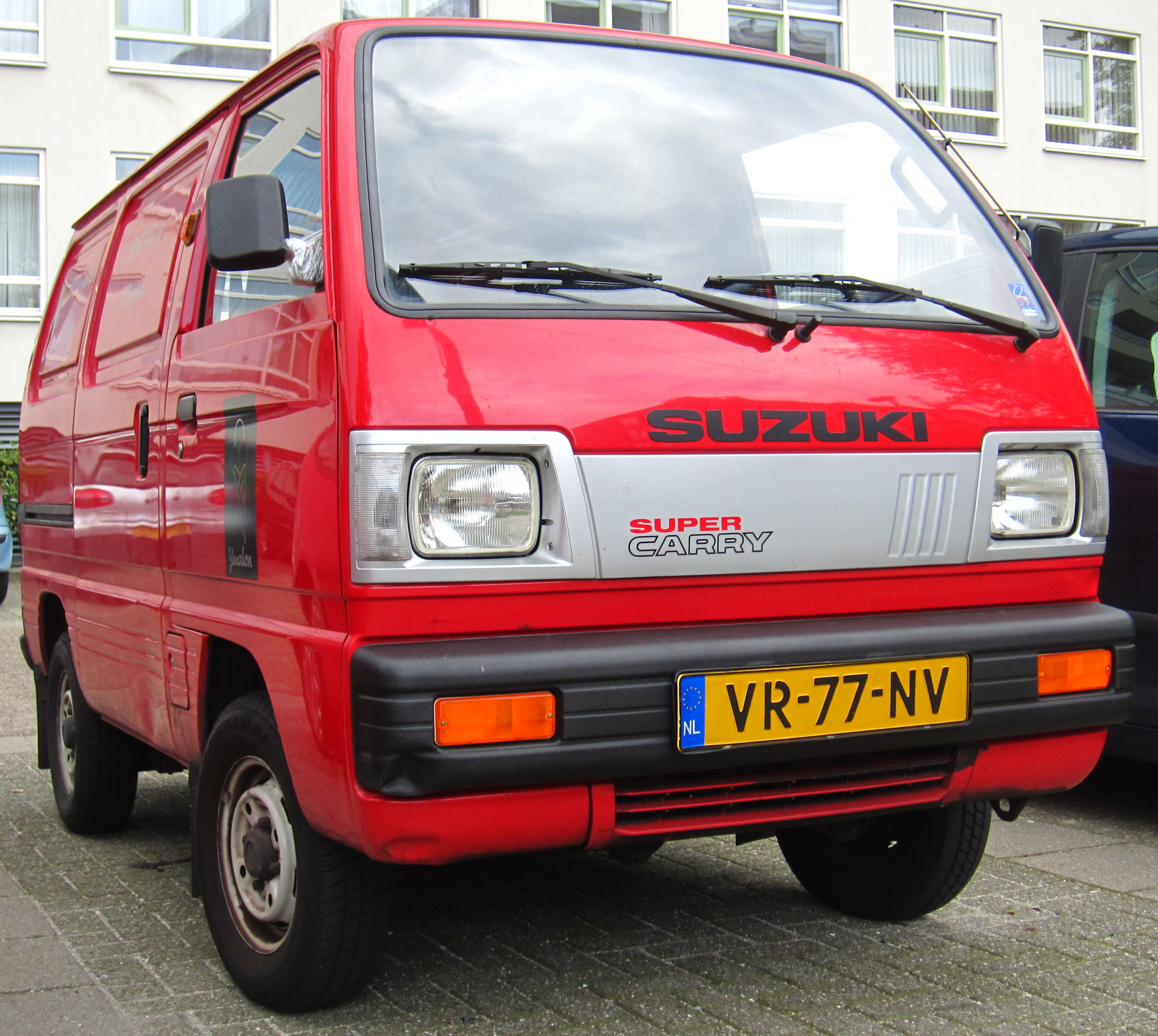
1992 Suzuki Super Carry Commercial TX van (SK410, Netherlands)

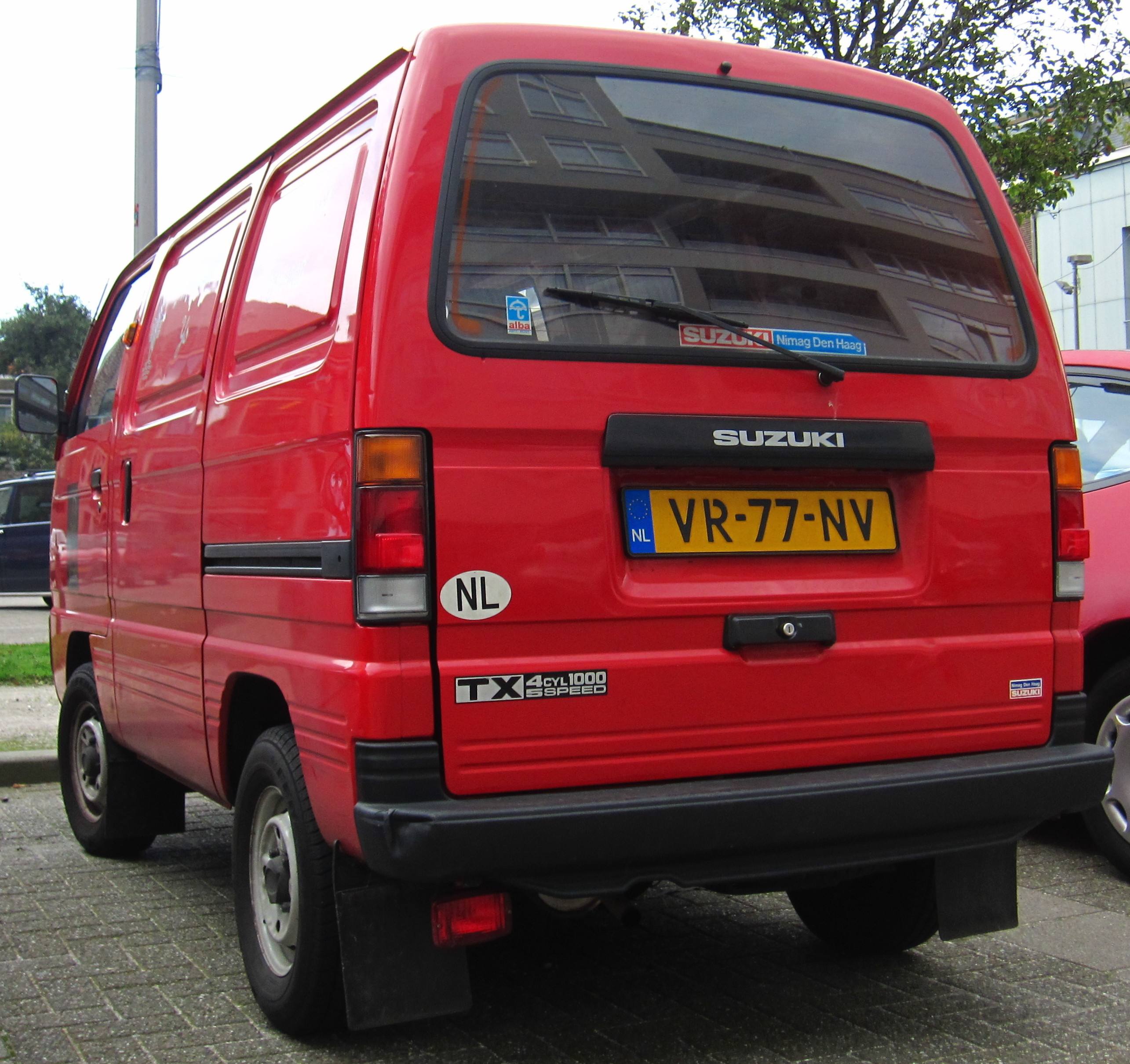
1992 Suzuki Super Carry Commercial TX van (SK410, Netherlands)

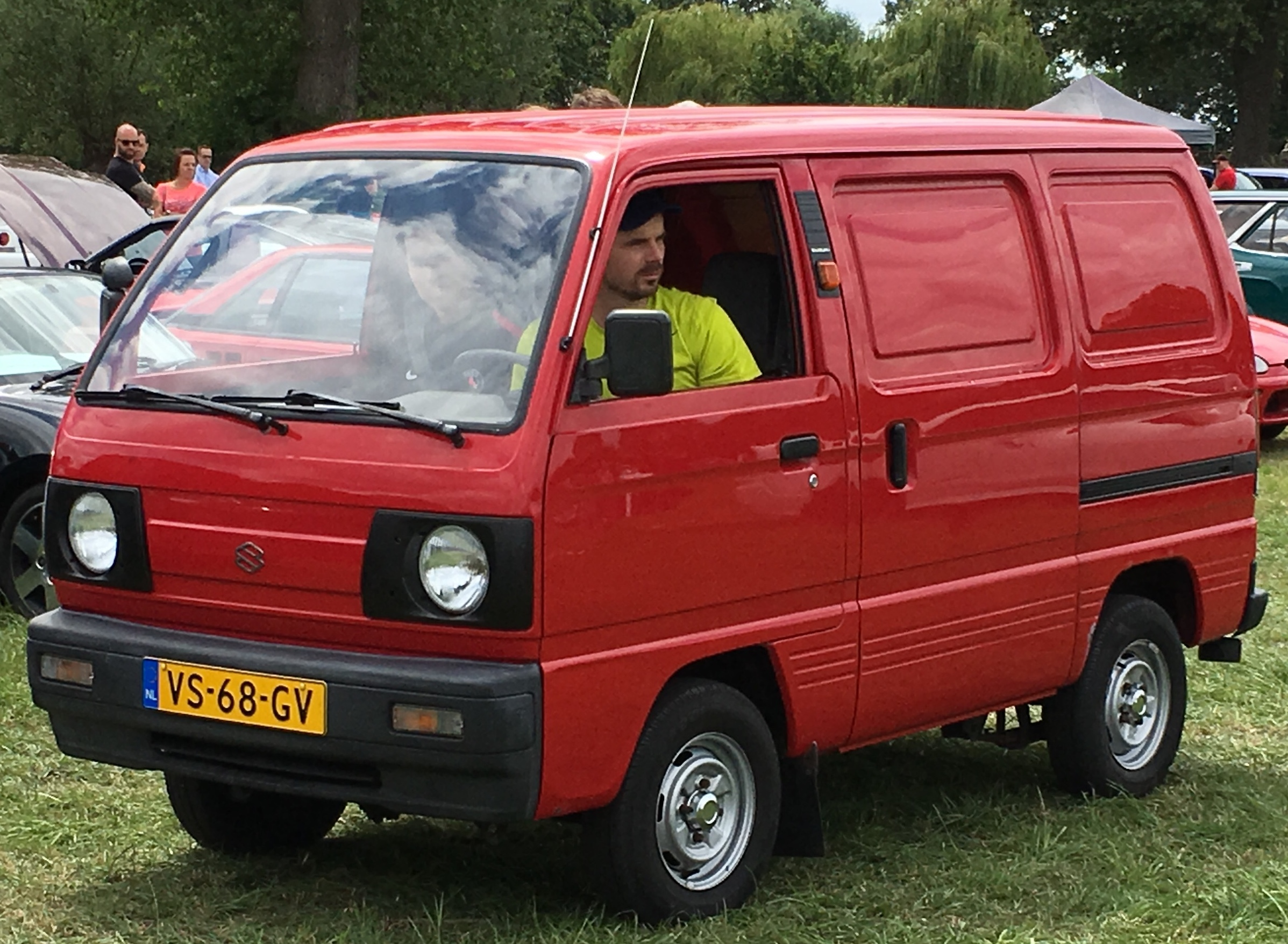
1992 Suzuki Super Carry Commercial van (SK410, Netherlands)

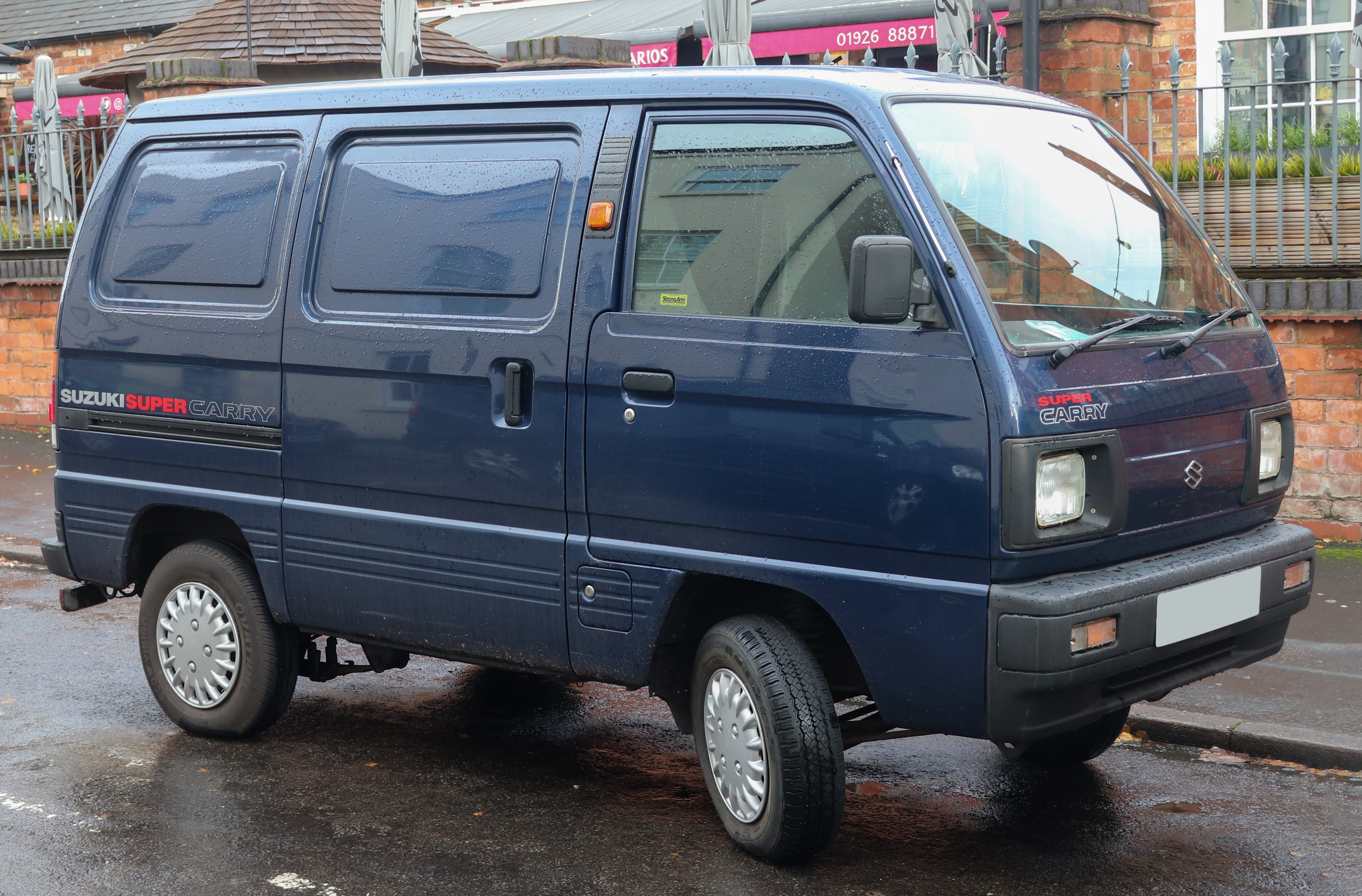
1997 Suzuki Super Carry TX van (SK410, United Kingdom)

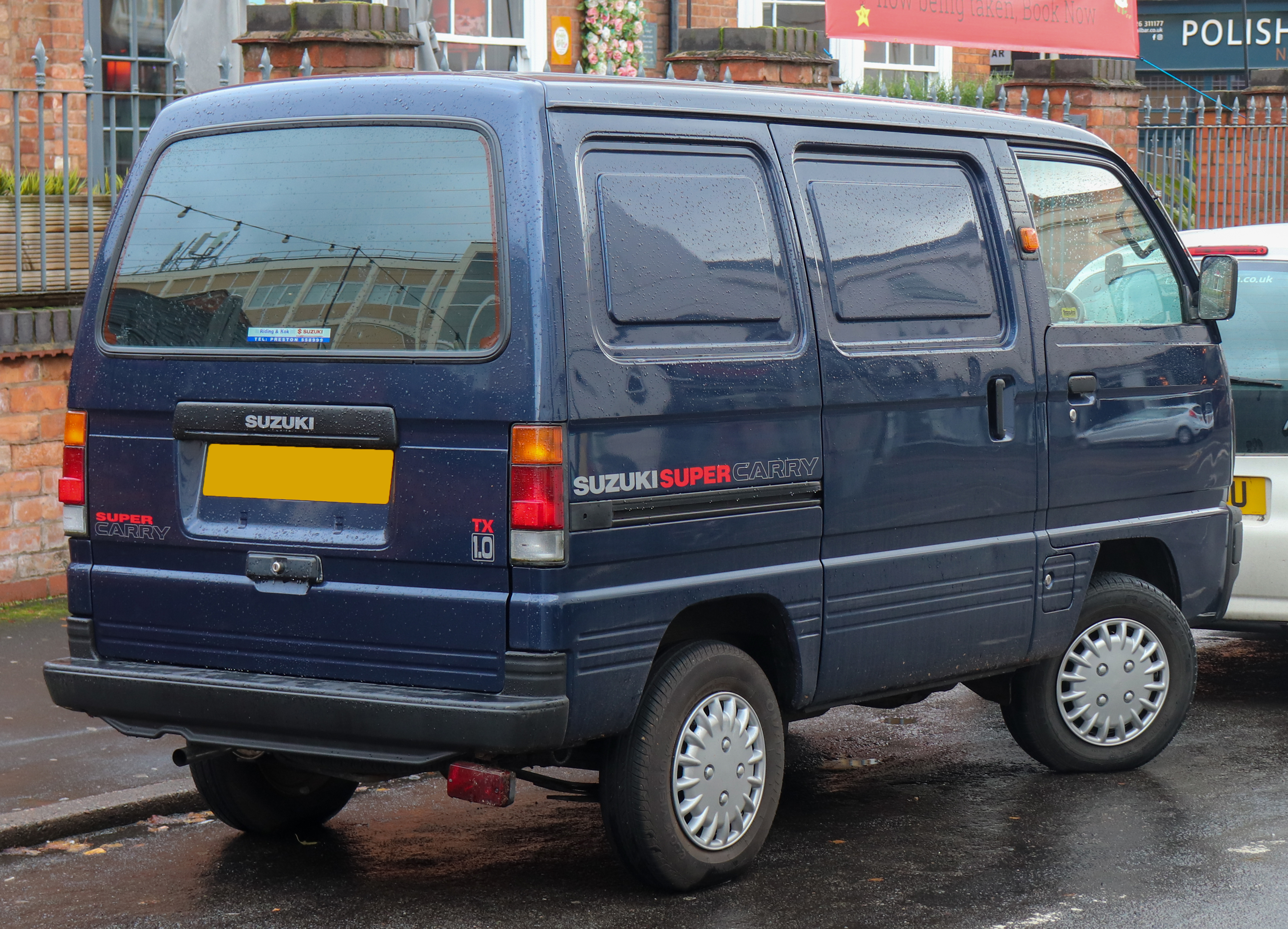
1997 Suzuki Super Carry TX van (SK410, United Kingdom)

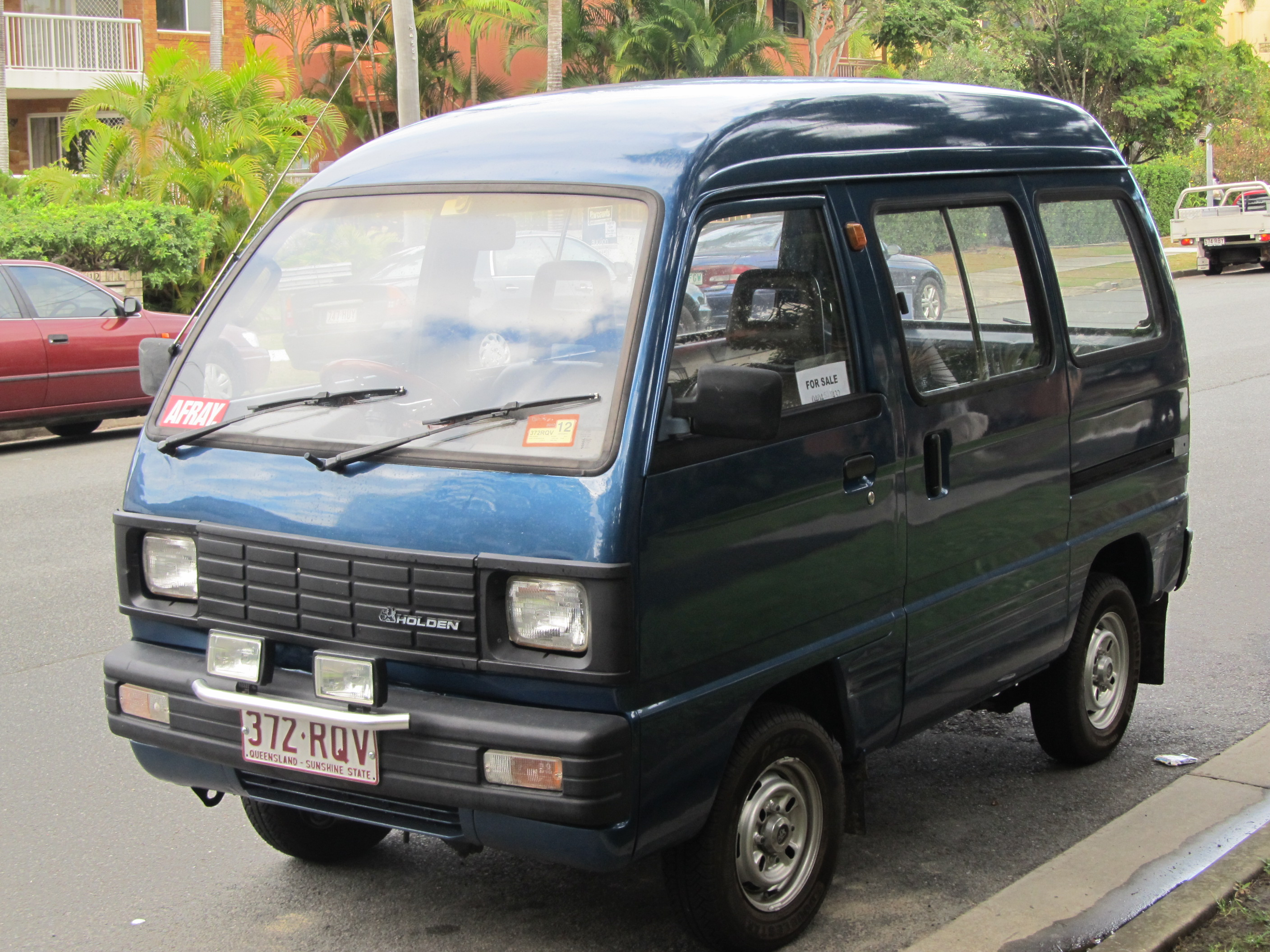
Holden Scurry (NB, Australia)

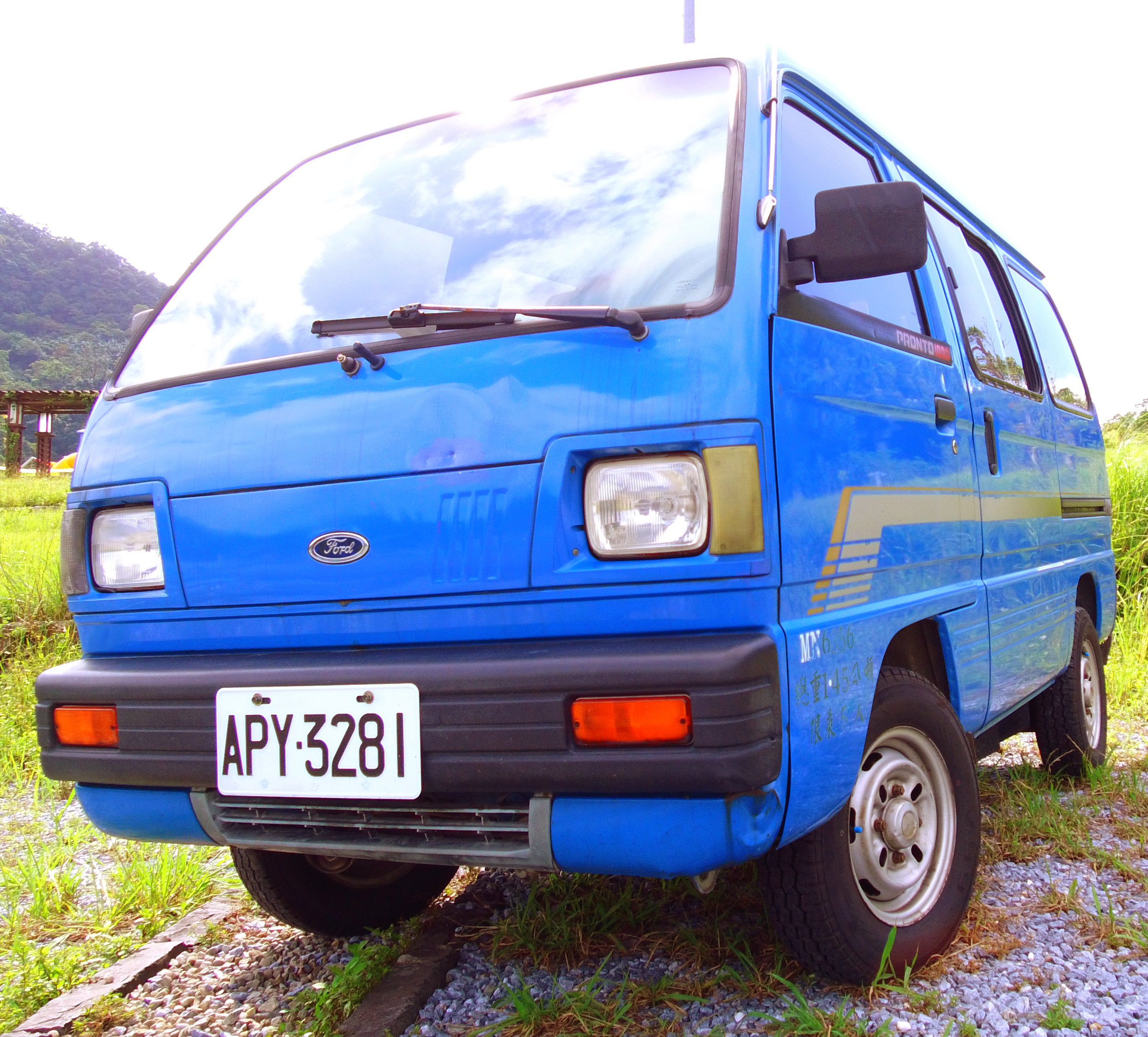
Ford Pronto van (Taiwan)

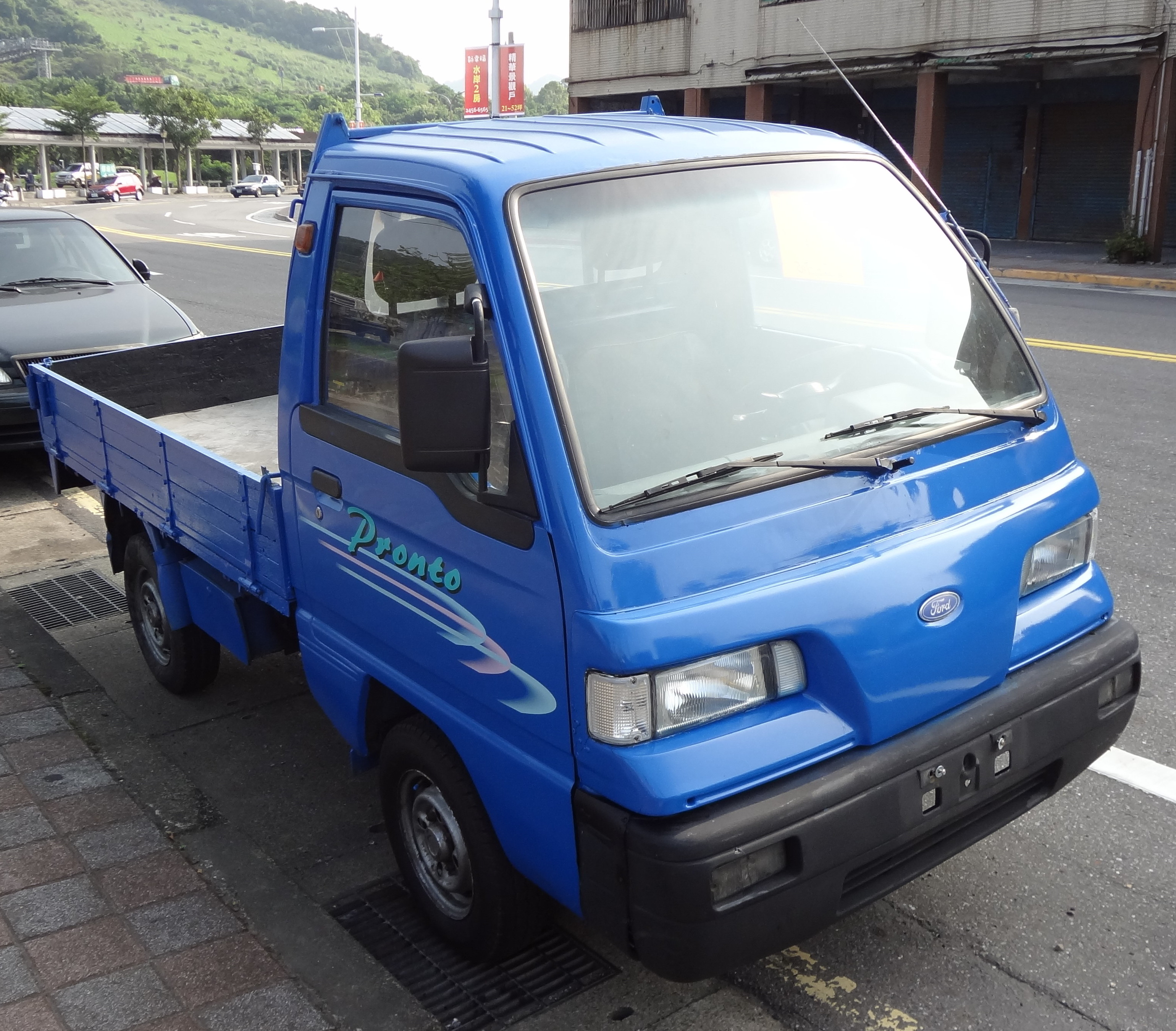
1999 Ford Pronto truck (Taiwan)

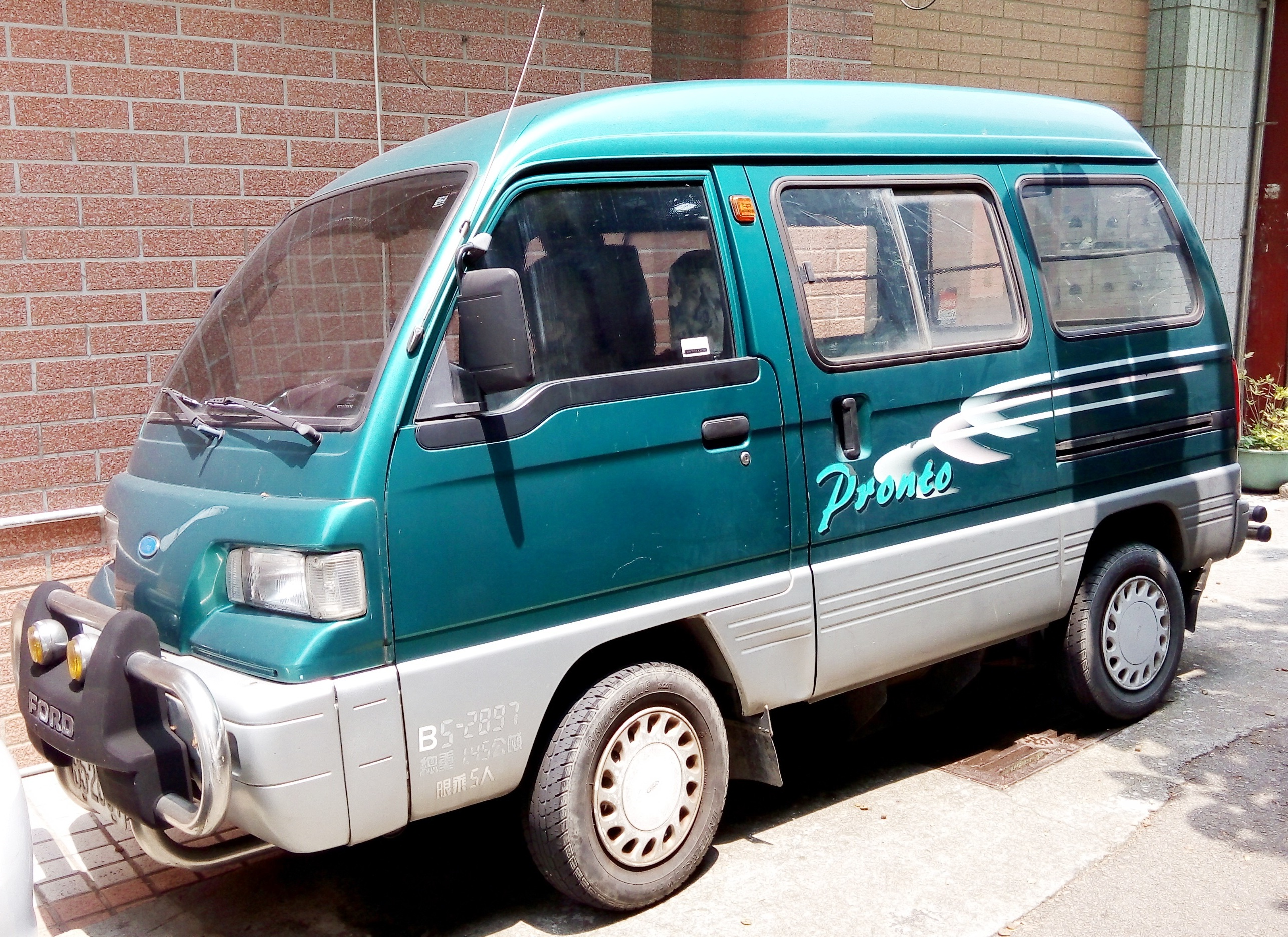
1999 Ford Pronto van (Taiwan)

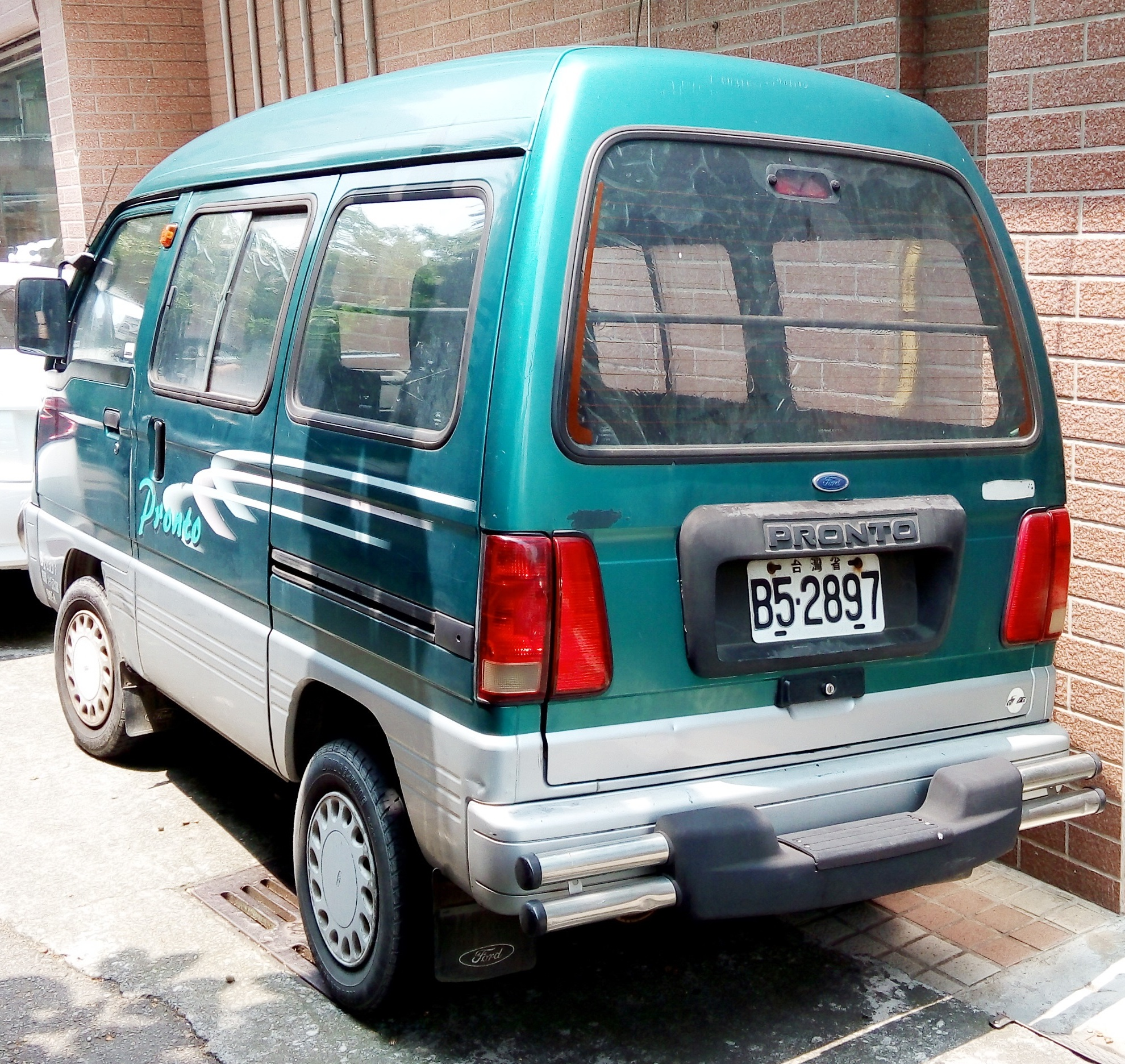
1999 Ford Pronto van (Taiwan)

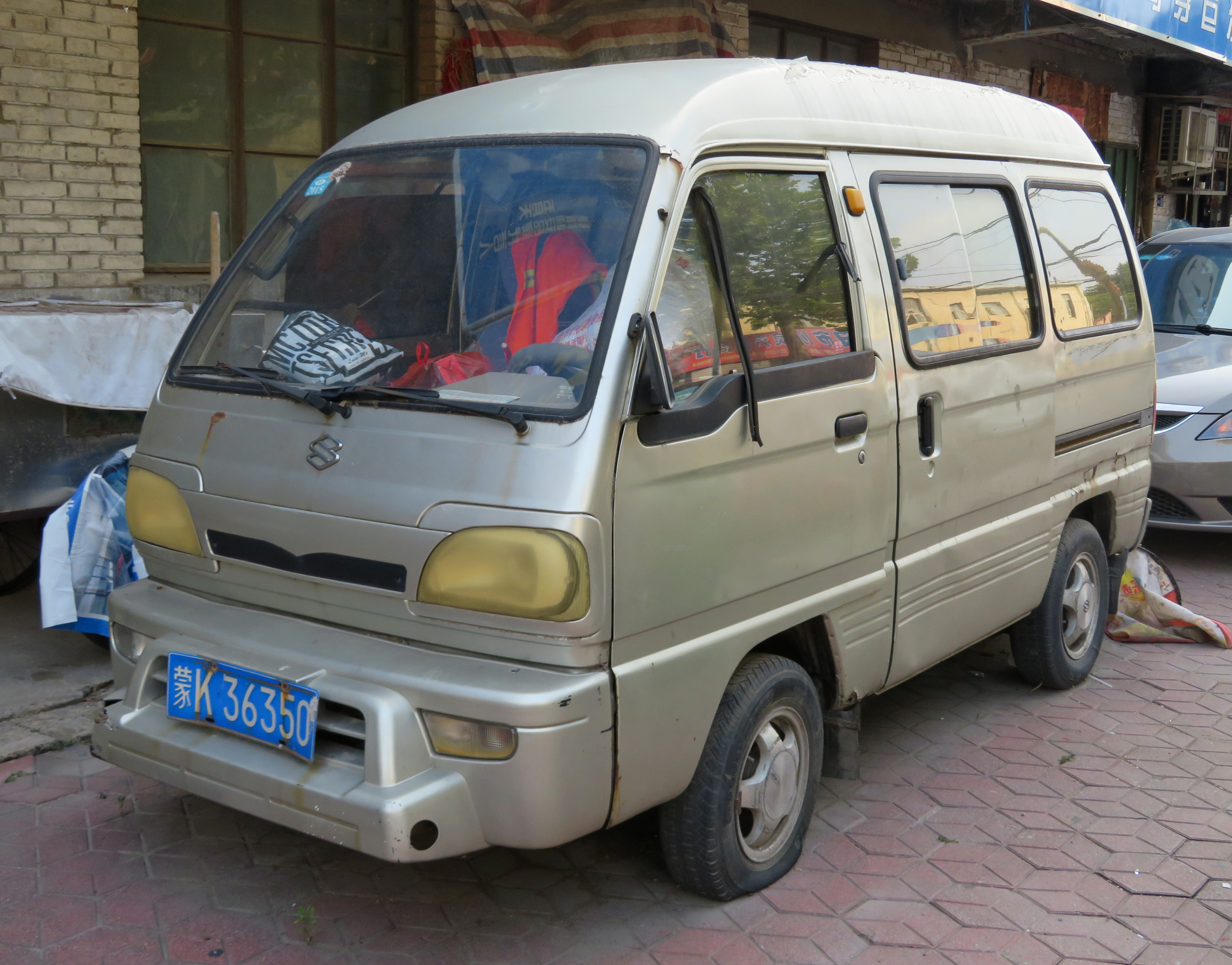
Changhe Changlingwang CH6353A (China)

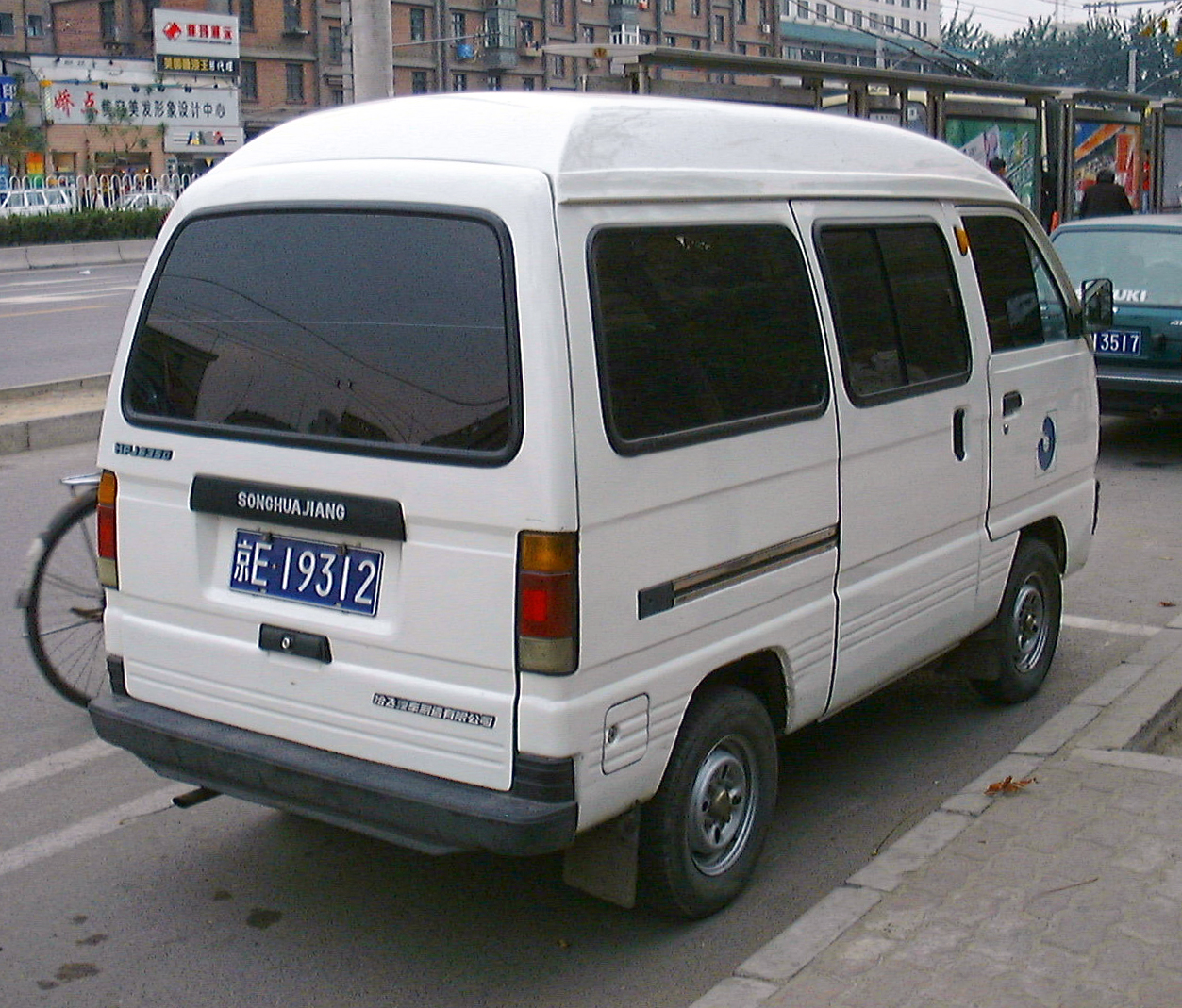
1995–1999 Hafei Songhuajiang HFJ6350 (China)

=== Bedford Rascal ===
Bedford Rascal
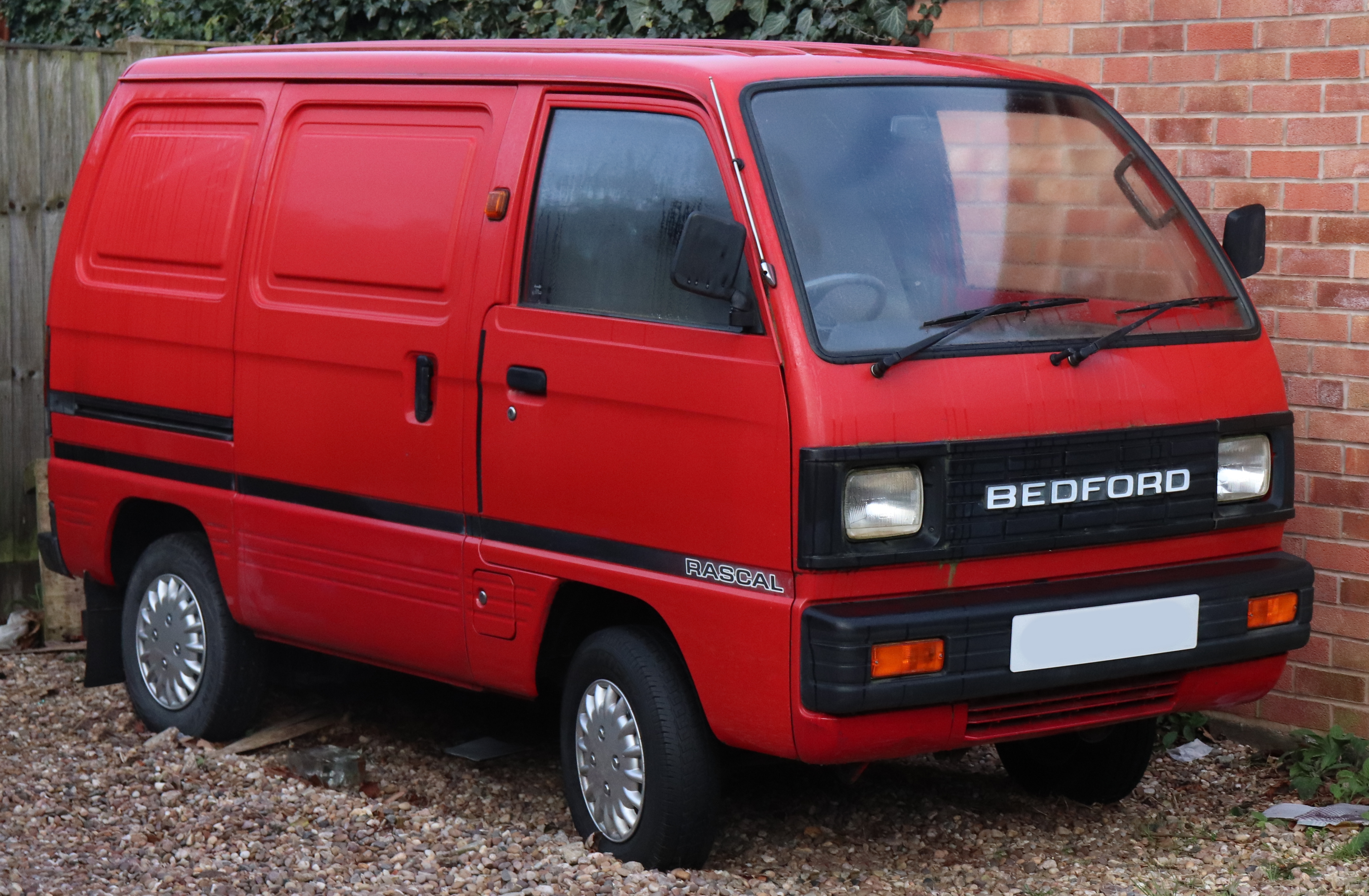

Overview
- Manufacturer: Bedford/Vauxhall (General Motors)
- Also called: Vauxhall Rascal; GME Rascal; Holden Scurry
- Production: 1986–1993 (England); 1993–1999 (Japan)
- Assembly: United Kingdom: Luton (Vauxhall Luton)

Body and chassis
- Body style: 5-door van 2-door pickup Campervan
- Layout: Front mid-engine, rear-wheel-drive

Powertrain
- Engine: 970 cc (1.0 L) F10A I4
- Transmission: 4/5-speed manual

Dimensions
- Length: 3,295 mm (129.7 in)
- Width: 1,395 mm (54.9 in)
- Height: 1,780 mm (70.1 in)
- Curb weight: 755 kg (1,664 lb)

Chronology
- Successor: Opel/Vauxhall Combo

The Bedford Rascal (later Vauxhall Rascal), also built as the Suzuki Super Carry, is a kei truck and microvan that was developed as a joint venture between the American automaker General Motors and the Japanese automaker Suzuki. It was sold under GM's British Bedford marque as well as in Suzuki form. Other names were used in a few international markets, such as GME (General Motors Europe) for those continental European markets where Suzukis were generally not marketed and where the Bedford and Vauxhall brands were largely unknown.

The van was produced at the IBC Vehicles plant in Luton, England, adjacent to the main Vauxhall factory. Alongside the Bedford, the Suzuki-branded twin was manufactured for the European market (where Bedford is a less established brand).

Sold from 1986 to 1994, the Rascal, like the Super Carry, is a small and economical van intended for many purposes. The vehicle's strengths were its diminutive size and maximum payload weight; 550 kg for the van and 575 kg for the pickup. The principal visible difference between Bedford and Suzuki versions is the front trim: the Super Carry has two separate plastic headlamp surrounds and the Rascal has a single full-width one with "Bedford" moulded in the middle.

Timeline:

- 1986: launched
- 1990: rebadged as the Vauxhall Rascal, as the Bedford marque was being retired
- 1993: production moved to Japan, where the vehicle continued to be made until 1999.

Rascals were mainly sold as vans; pickup and camper versions were also made.

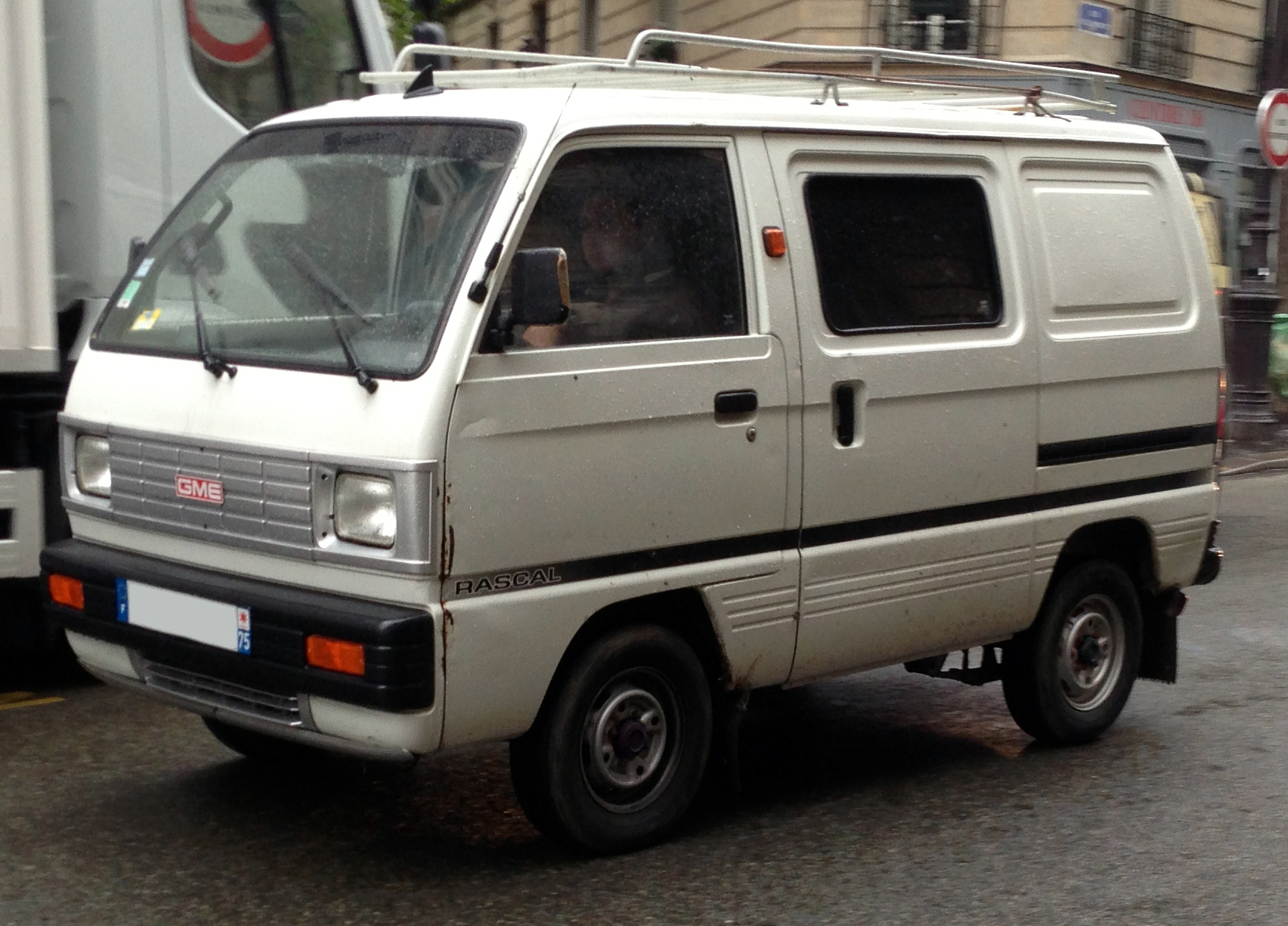
GME Rascal, for continental European markets

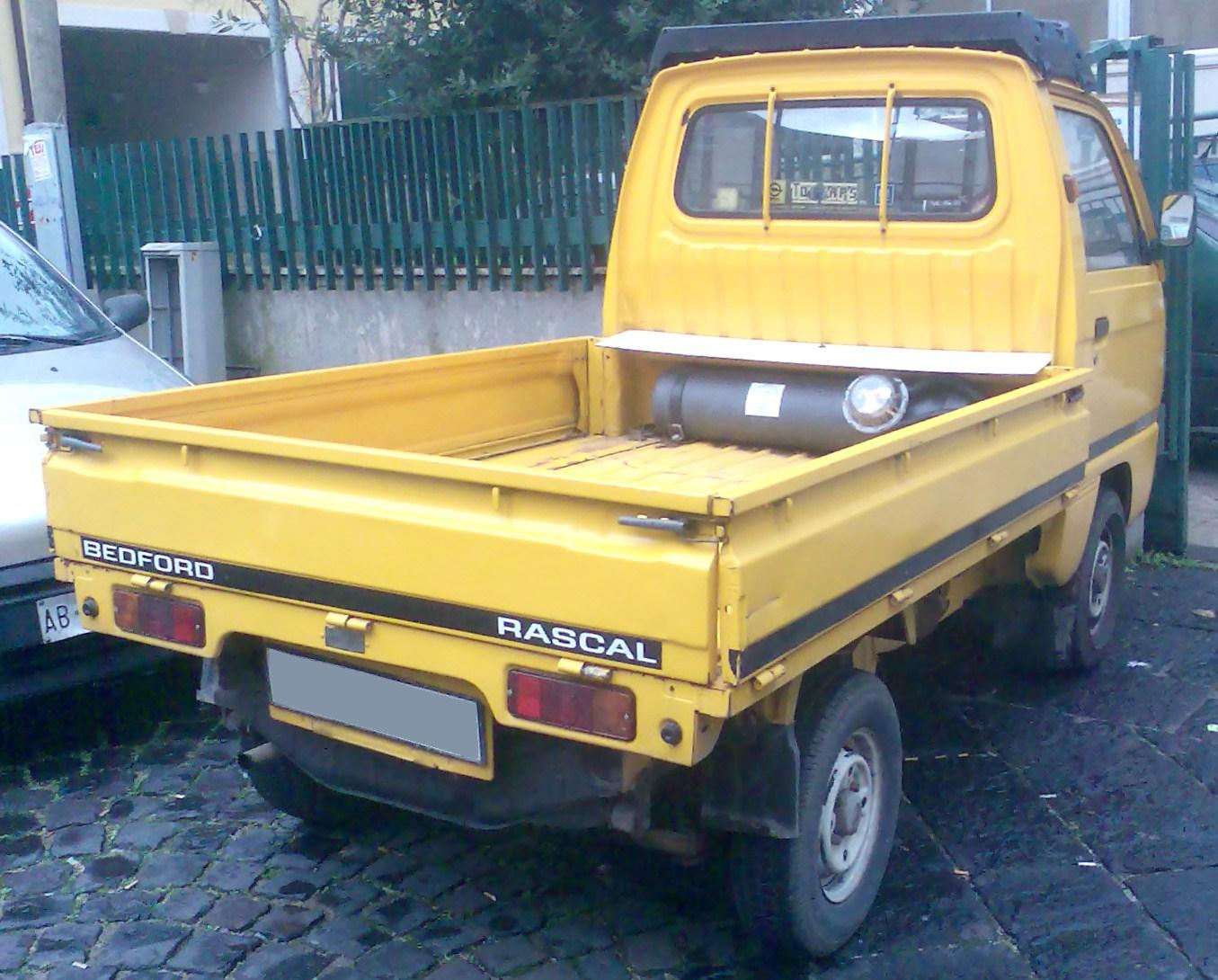
Rear view of Rascal pickup

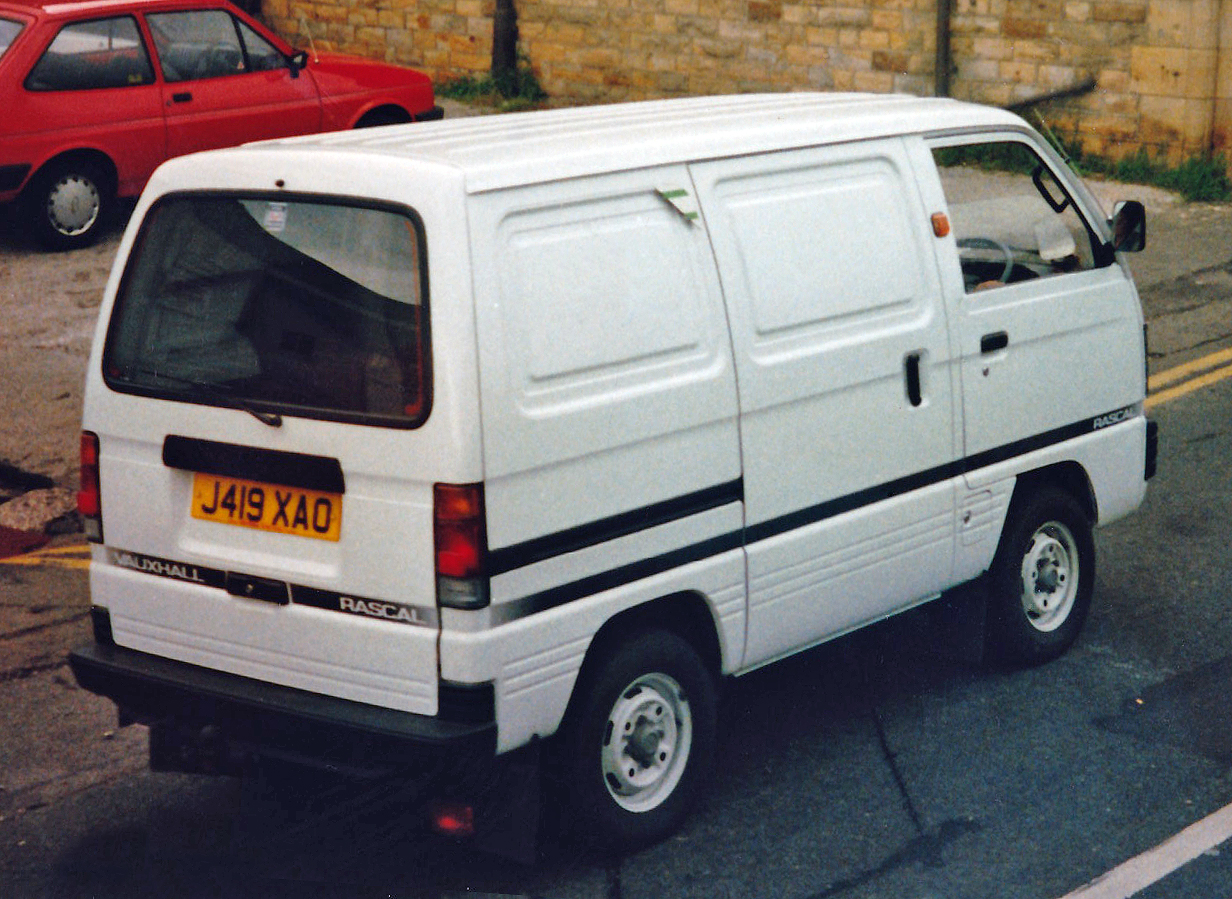
Vauxhall Rascal

=== Daewoo Damas ===
Daewoo Damas and Daewoo Labo
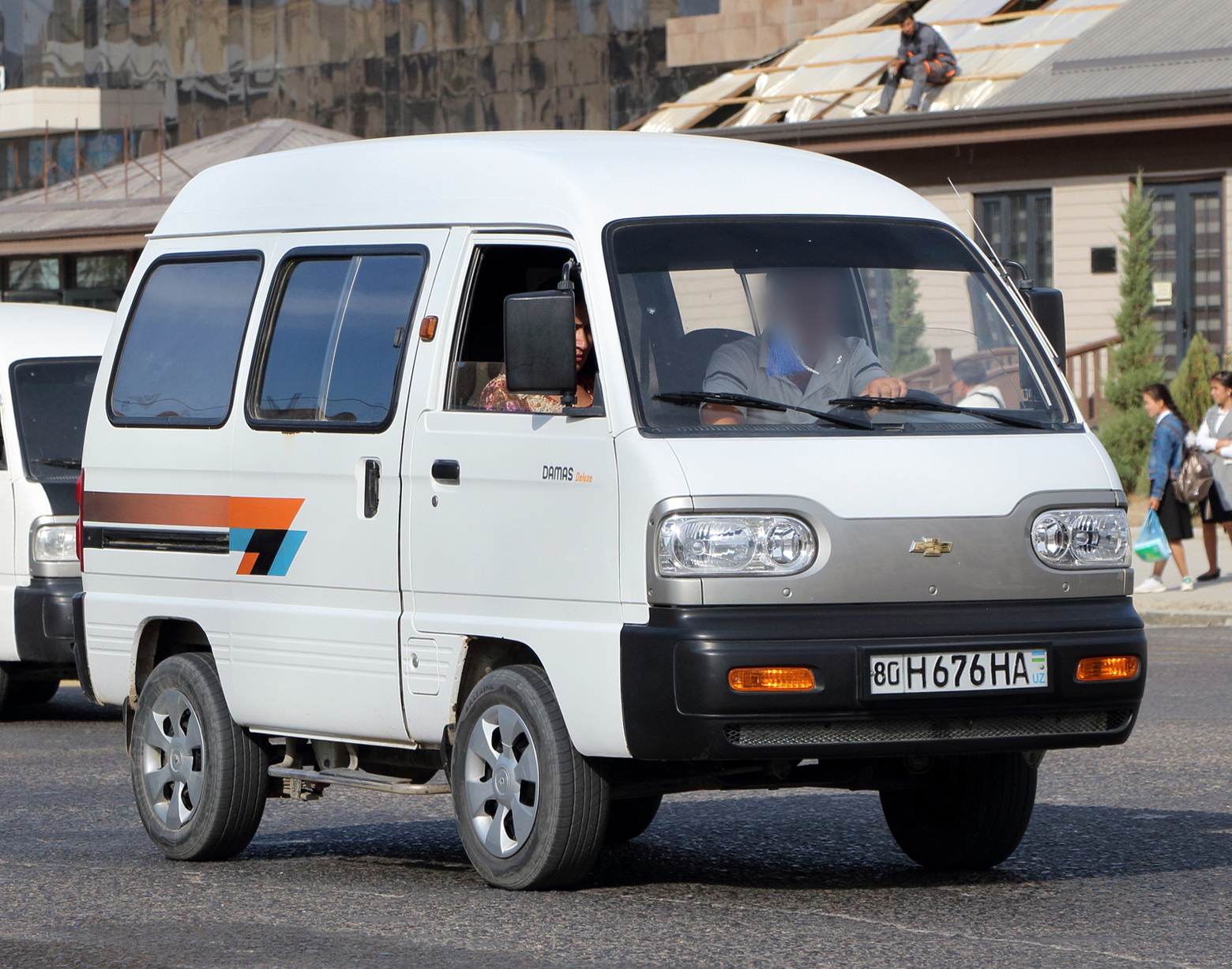
- Chevrolet Damas (Uzbek-built)

Overview
- Manufacturer: Daewoo (General Motors) (1992–2011); GM Korea (2011–2021); JJ Motors (2021–present); UzDaewoo Auto (1996–2008); GM Uzbekistan (2008–2019); UzAuto Motors (2019–present)
- Also called: Daewoo Attivo/Damas/Labo; Chevrolet CMP/CMV; Chevrolet Damas/Labo; JJ Motors Viva / Bravo; Viva Mobility Viva / Bravo
- Production: 1991–2021
- Assembly: Changwon, South Korea; Asaka, Uzbekistan (Asaka avtomobilsozlik zavodi, until 2014); Pitnak, Uzbekistan (KHorazm avtomobilsozlik zavodi); Hajigabul, Azerbaijan (Azermash)

Body and chassis
- Body style: 4-door van 2-door pickup
- Layout: FMR layout

Powertrain
- Engine: 796 cc (0.8 L) I3

The Daewoo Damas is a badge-engineered version of the Suzuki Carry/Every produced by the South Korean automaker Daewoo since 1991. It is currently in its second generation and is available in van and pickup body styles, the latter of which was marketed as the Daewoo Labo. Since 2011, the Damas and Labo are sold in South Korea without branding, essentially making "Damas" and "Labo" the brands.

In some export markets, the Daewoo Damas was known as the Daewoo Attivo and since General Motors' takeover of Daewoo, it has been known in some markets, such as Central America and Tunisia, as Chevrolet CMV for the passenger van (Damas) and Chevrolet CMP for the pickup truck (Labo).

The Damas and Labo both come with the three-cylinder SOHC 796-cc F8C engine rather than the smaller 660-cc units originally used in Japan, to provide more power and comfort. Both the Damas and Labos are only available with a manual transmission. Air conditioning is optional. The engine was originally made for petrol, but is recently only available in South Korea as an LPG-powered unit.

The Damas microvan is available as a seven-seat coach, five-seat coach, or two-seat cargo van styles and comes with various options based on DLX (deluxe) and SUPER models. The Labo is also available in STD (standard), DLX (deluxe), and SUPER models. Two main choices of the Labo body type are the cube van and the drop-side pickup truck. The pickup has an optional electric tailgate lift.

The Damas (but not the Labo) received a facelift in July 2003, stretching the nose by 245 mm (9.6 in) to meet stricter safety regulations for passenger vehicles. This was marketed as the Daewoo Damas II in South Korea. Over the years, the Labo has been equipped with a number of the various grille and headlight combinations originating with the Japanese Carry and Every variations. In January 2007, Labo and Damas production was halted as they could not be made to meet emissions regulations. Production resumed (as the New Damas) in April 2008, although now only with LPG engines for the home market. In March 2011, the "Daewoo" badging was dropped, leaving the cars without a "family name" in the South Korean market.

In December 2013, production was again halted, as the Damas and Labo would not meet requirements for all motor vehicles produced after 2014 to have oxygen sensors installed. The Damas and Labo also do not fulfill South Korean requirements for on-board diagnostics to be installed, although they have been exempted from such regulations. A campaign by small business owners, stoking fear of a flood of Chinese imports replacing the domestic-made trucklets, pushed the government to create an exemption for the Damas and Labo, and production recommenced in August 2014. South Korean production was extended to 2020, when the government's moratorium on meeting the emissions requirement was to run out. In 2019, however, the Korean government further extended this exemption, allowing the little trucks to remain in production for another year at least.

VIDAMCO of Vietnam produced the Damas in complete knock-down kit until 2018.

Uzbekistan

The Damas is the predominant form of public transport in Uzbekistan. In Damas marshrutkas, generally far more than seven passengers are crammed. Local production at the newly established UzDaewoo Auto began in 1996. The Damas and the Labo, alongside the Tico, were the company's first products. Local parts content has gradually increased over the years. In 2004, the Daewoo Labo truck was discontinued, but it was returned to production as the "Chevrolet Labo" in 2015. The Labo is only built in UzAuto's Khorezm Plant, in the town of Pitnak. The longer-nosed Daewoo Damas II replaced the original design in 2006. Subsequent to General Motors' takeover of the UzDaewoo plant in 2008, the name of the Damas II was changed to "Chevrolet Damas." Since about that time, the Chevrolet Damas has been offered in a basic Van trim or as the 7-seater Deluxe, with a colorful graphic along the flank.

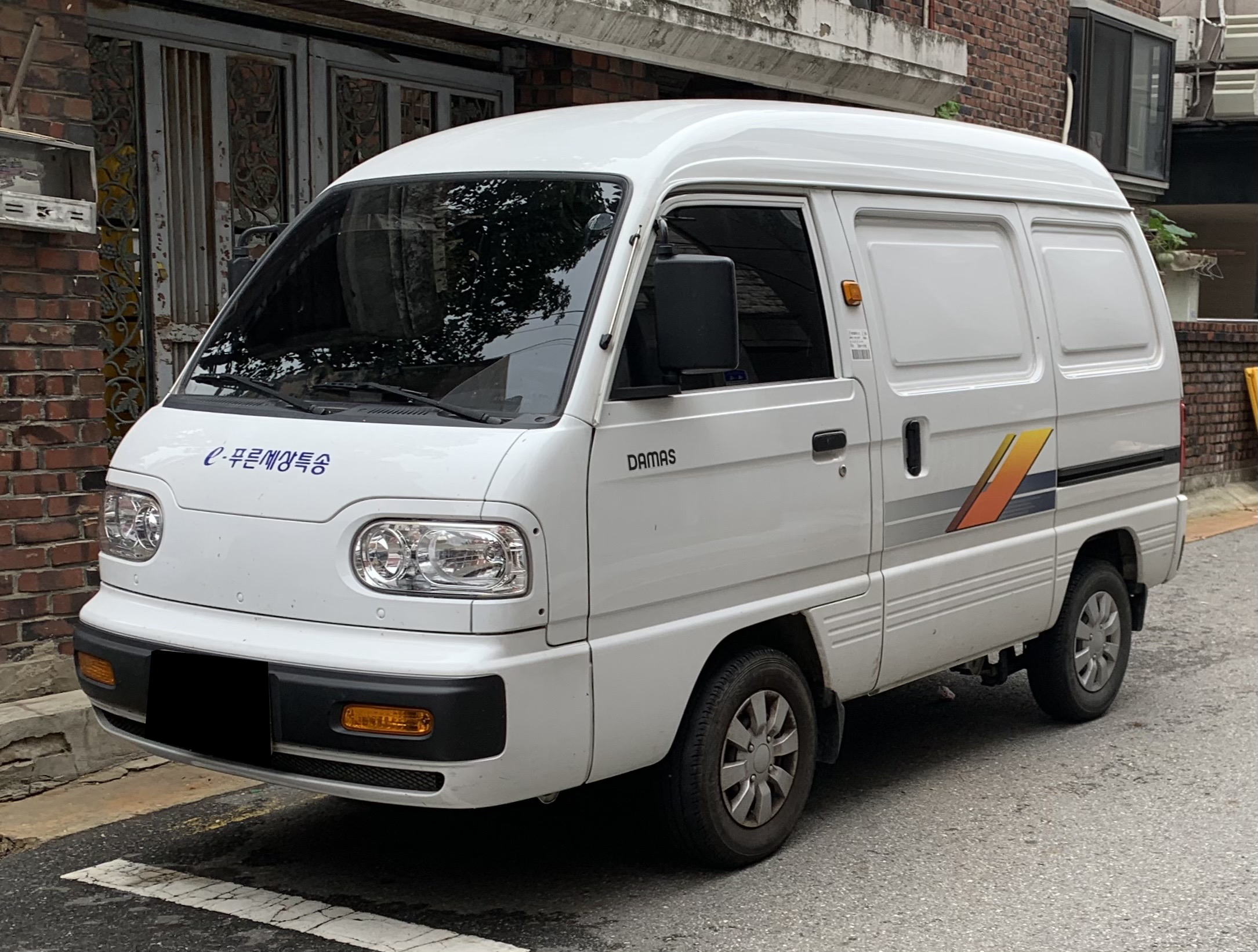
Daewoo Damas

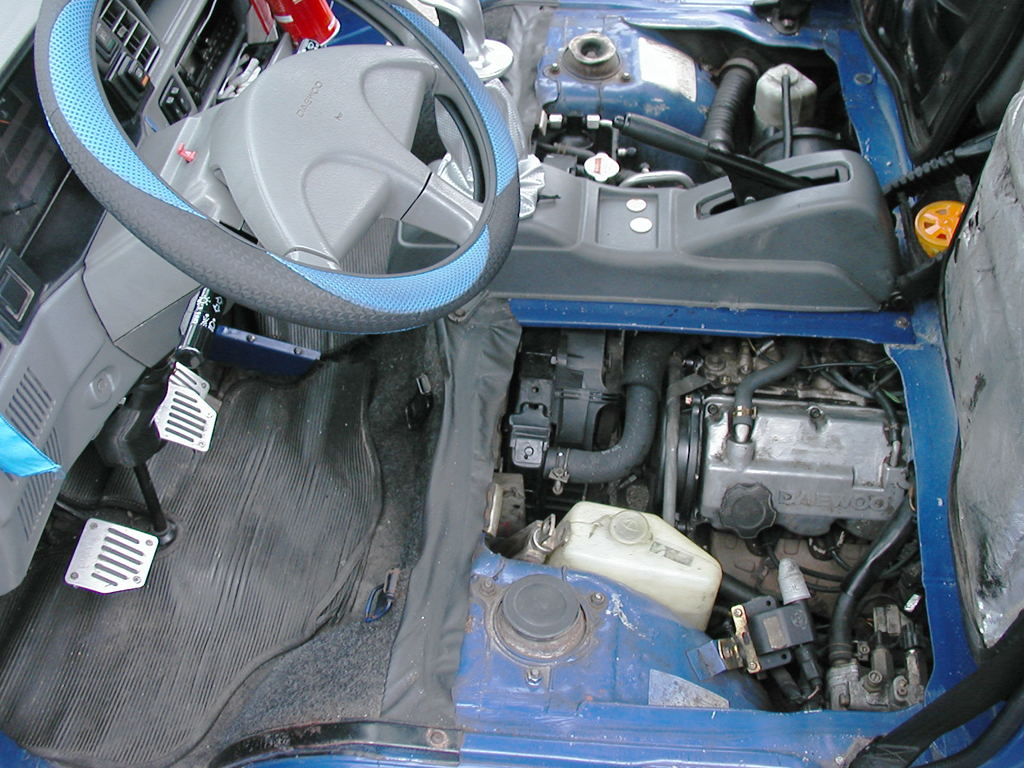
Daewoo Damas, engine compartment

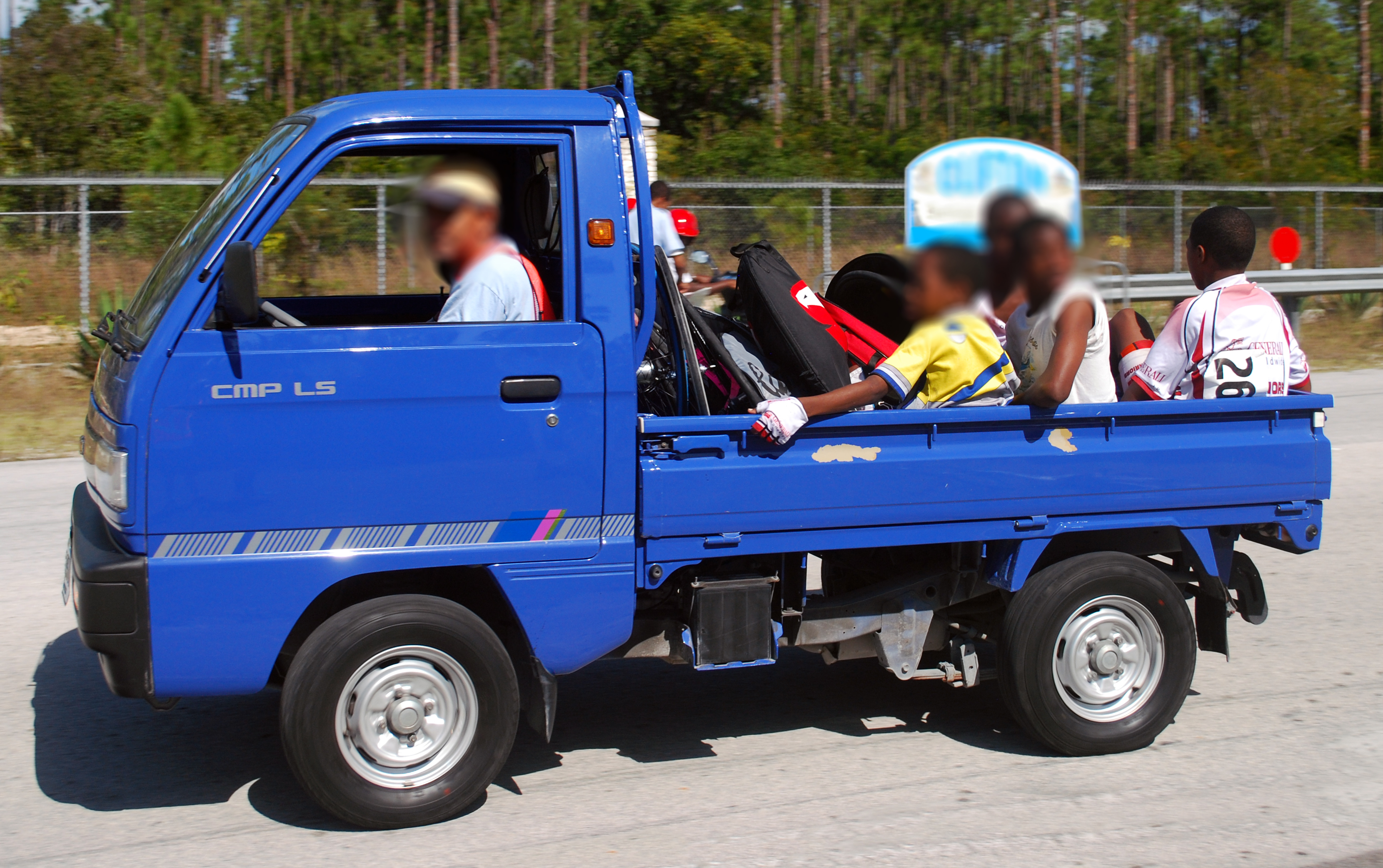
Chevrolet CMP (a rebadged Labo)

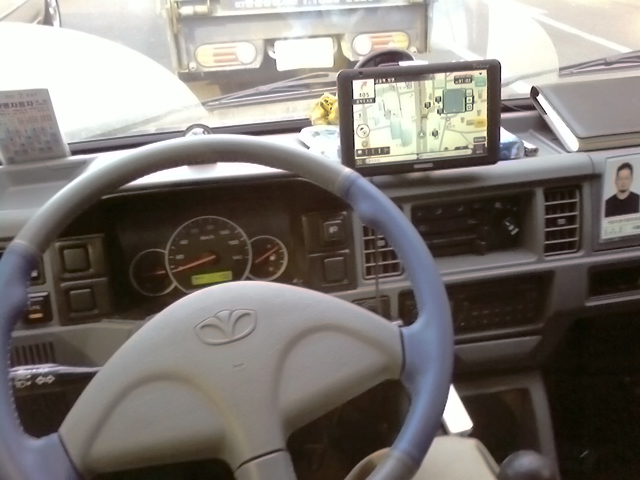
2010 Daewoo Damas interior

== Ninth generation (DC51T/DD51T/DE51V/DF51V; 1991) ==
Ninth generation (DC51T/DD51T/DE51V/DF51V)
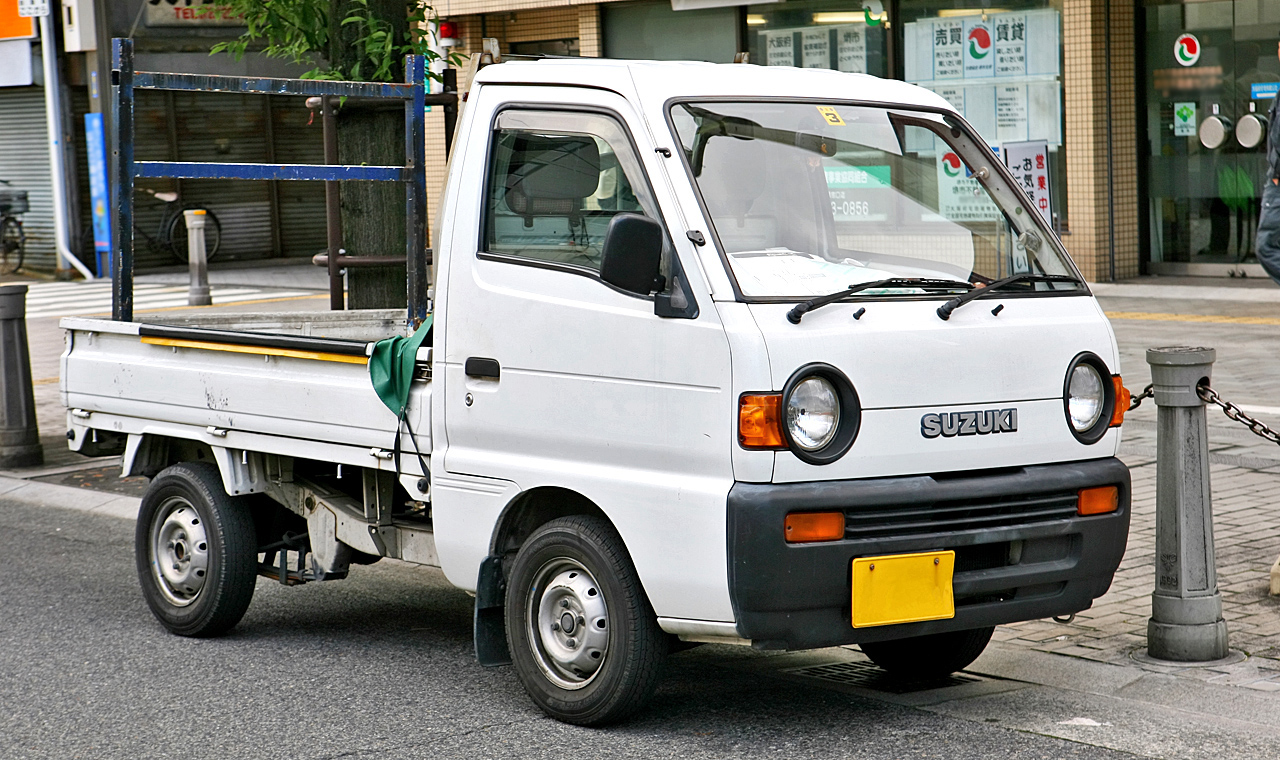
- 1991–1999 Suzuki Carry truck

Overview
- Also called: Autozam Scrum; Suzuki Every (van variant)
- Production: 1991–1999
- Assembly: Japan: Iwata, Shizuoka

Body and chassis
- Body style: 2-door pickup 5-door van/microbus
- Layout: FMR layout, rear-wheel drive / four-wheel drive (Carry) mid-engine, rear-wheel drive / four-wheel drive (Every/Carry Van)

Powertrain
- Engine: 657 cc F6A I3
- Transmission: 4/5-speed manual 3-speed automatic

Dimensions
- Wheelbase: 1,855 mm (73.0 in) (Carry); 2,000 mm (78.7 in) (Every/Carry Van)
- Length: 3,295 mm (129.7 in)
- Width: 1,395 mm (54.9 in)
- Height: 1,715–1,865 mm (67.5–73.4 in)
- Curb weight: 650–720 kg (1,433–1,587 lb)

The ninth generation Carry appeared in September 1991. The 657 cc F6A engine remained from the previous generation, but an all-new bodywork was much smoother, originally with slim, small rectangular headlights. The chassis was largely unchanged for the truck (albeit with a somewhat longer wheelbase), but the vans had a considerably longer wheelbase and an engine mounted midships, just ahead of the rear axle. Chassis codes changed accordingly, and were now different for the Carry and the Every. The trucks are DC/DD51T ("DD" for four-wheel drive versions).

The ninth-generation Carry received a very gentle facelift in September 1993, including a switch from front drum brakes to discs on all models. Two months later, the Carry Van line switched to the Every nameplate and the division between trucks and vans was made clearer. Another light change occurred in July 1995, when the front turn signals were changed from clear to amber and the wheel bolt pattern was changed from 4x114.3mm to 4x100mm. The ninth generation continued to be built until 1999. Most export markets continued to receive the previous generation Carry with bigger engines and most commonly with van bodywork. The older Super Carry is generally more rugged than the DE/DF51, which was fitted with a coil sprung De Dion rear axle not as suitable for carrying heavy loads. In the few foreign markets where the ninth generation Carry was available, it was sold as the SK306, fitted with a version of the 657 cc engine as used in the Japanese domestic market.

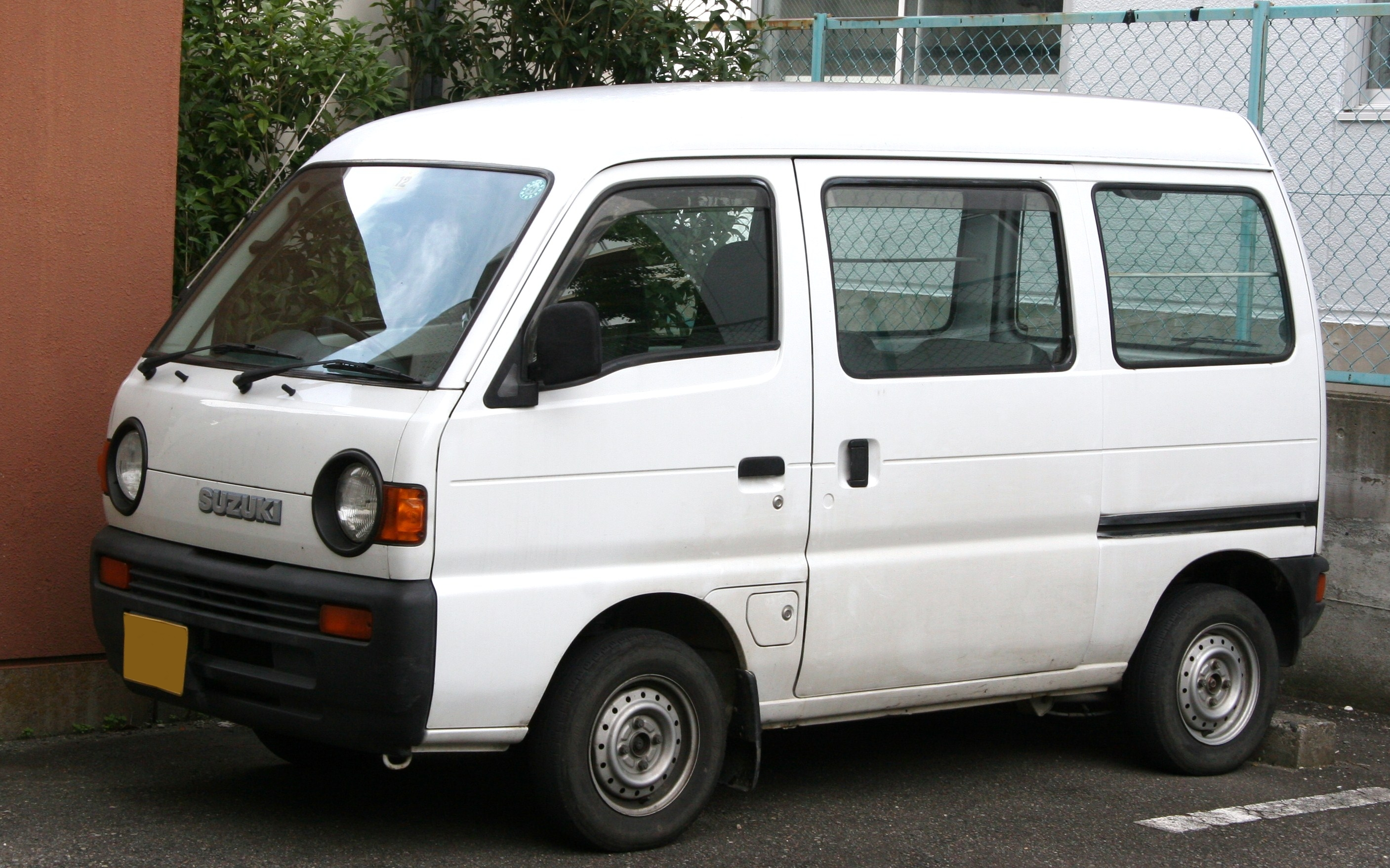
Suzuki Carry van (DE51V, 1991–1993)

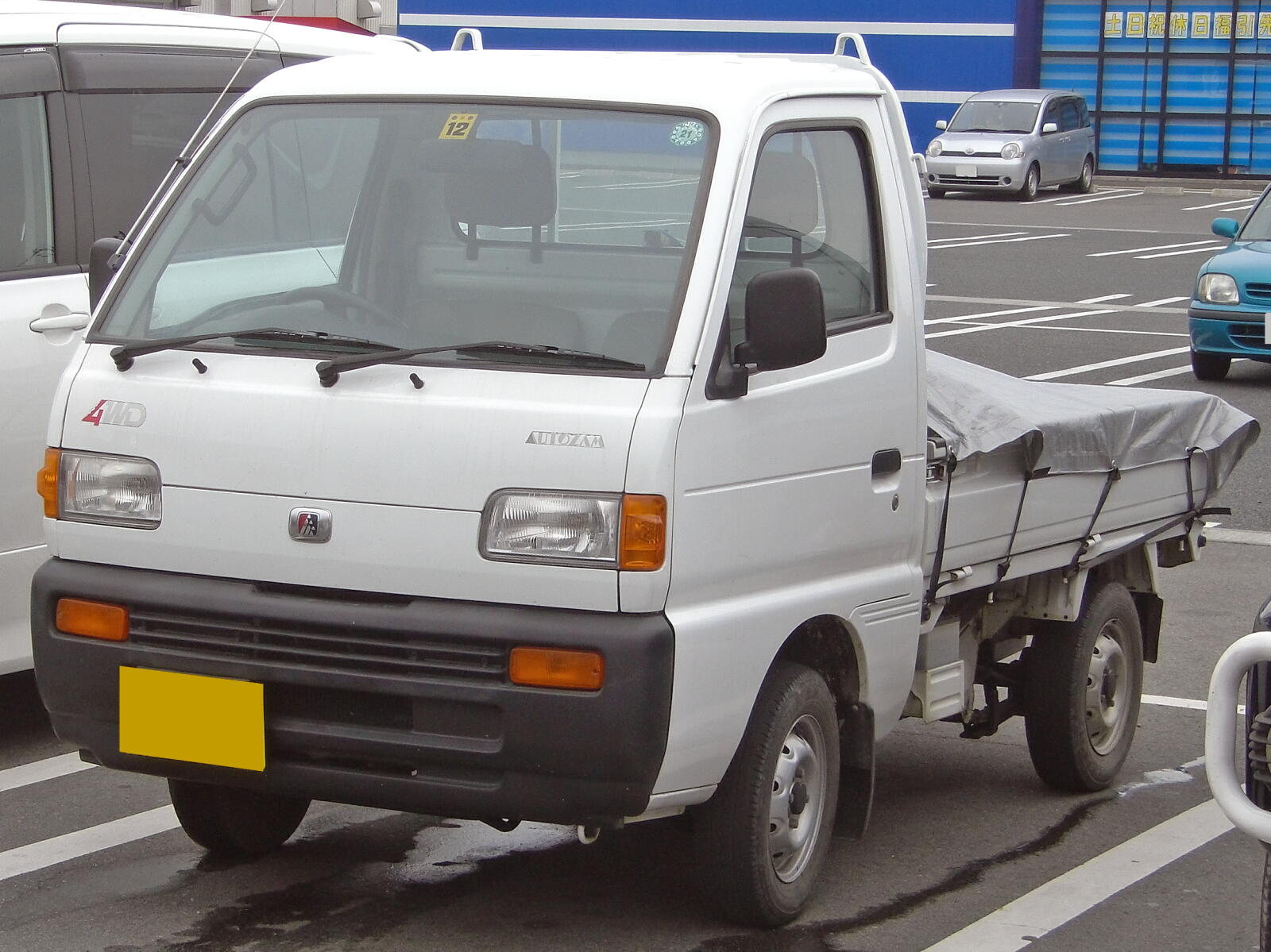
Autozam Scrum truck (second generation)

== Tenth generation (1999) ==
Tenth generation (DA52/DB52/DA62/DA63/DA65)
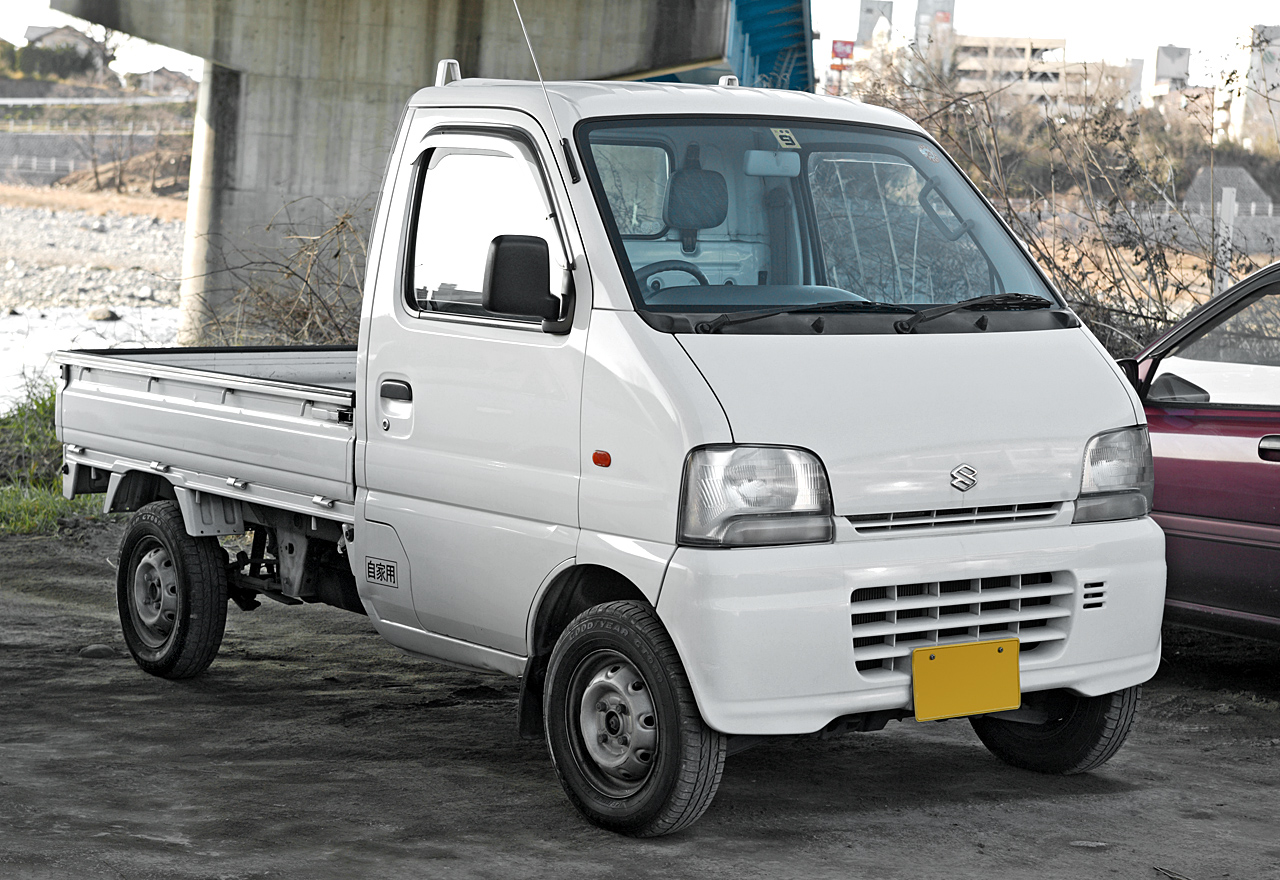
- 1999 Suzuki Carry truck

Overview
- Also called: Mazda Scrum; Ford Pronto PR-Z (Taiwan); Chana-Kuayue Xinbao; Chana Shenqi T20/T20L; Dongfeng DFAC Xiaobawang; Wanxiang K01 EV
- Production: 1999–2013 (Carry); 1999–2005 (Every); 2009–present (China)
- Assembly: Japan: Iwata, Shizuoka; China: Chongqing; Taiwan (Ford Lio Ho)

Body and chassis
- Body style: 2-door pickup 5-door van/microbus
- Layout: FMR layout, rear-wheel drive / four-wheel drive (Carry) mid-engine, rear-wheel drive / four-wheel drive (Every)

Powertrain
- Engine: 657 cc F6A I3; 657 cc F6A turbo I3; 657 cc K6A I3; 657 cc K6A turbo I3; 993 cc G10B 16V I4 (Pronto)
- Transmission: 5-speed manual 3-speed automatic

Dimensions
- Wheelbase: 1,905 mm (75 in) (Carry); 2,350 mm (93 in) (Every)
- Length: 3,395 mm (134 in)
- Width: 1,475 mm (58 in)
- Height: 1,755–1,800 mm (69–71 in)
- Curb weight: 650–780 kg (1,433–1,720 lb)

The tenth generation Carry was introduced in January 1999. It retained the F6A engine (albeit modernized) and was sold as the DA/DB52 T and V (Carry truck "DB" signifying four-wheel drive). A version with a fuel injected, six-valve F6A turbo engine with 60 PS (44 kW) was available in all models at the time of introduction. The Turbo was discontinued in May 2000 but was then reintroduced after the Carry/Every switched to the new, cleaner K6A engine in September 2001.

The Carry truck was completely rebodied in May 2002 and received a door redesign in April 2009, but the existing Every Van and Wagon continued to be produced until replaced in August 2005, as the two lines continued a process of divergence begun with the introduction of the Every in 1982. In November 2005, the Carry FC was introduced. This version, targeted to farmers, has a much shorter wheelbase (and correspondingly longer front overhang) to make it more maneuverable in tight places such as the narrow roads along rice fields. Another benefit was improved leg room as the wheel wells were now beneath the seats. The FC was only available with a five-speed manual transmission, with available four-wheel drive as well as an optional locking differential called "Agricultural Specification". The Carry FC had a class-leading turn circle with a radius of 3.6 metres (11 ft 10 in).

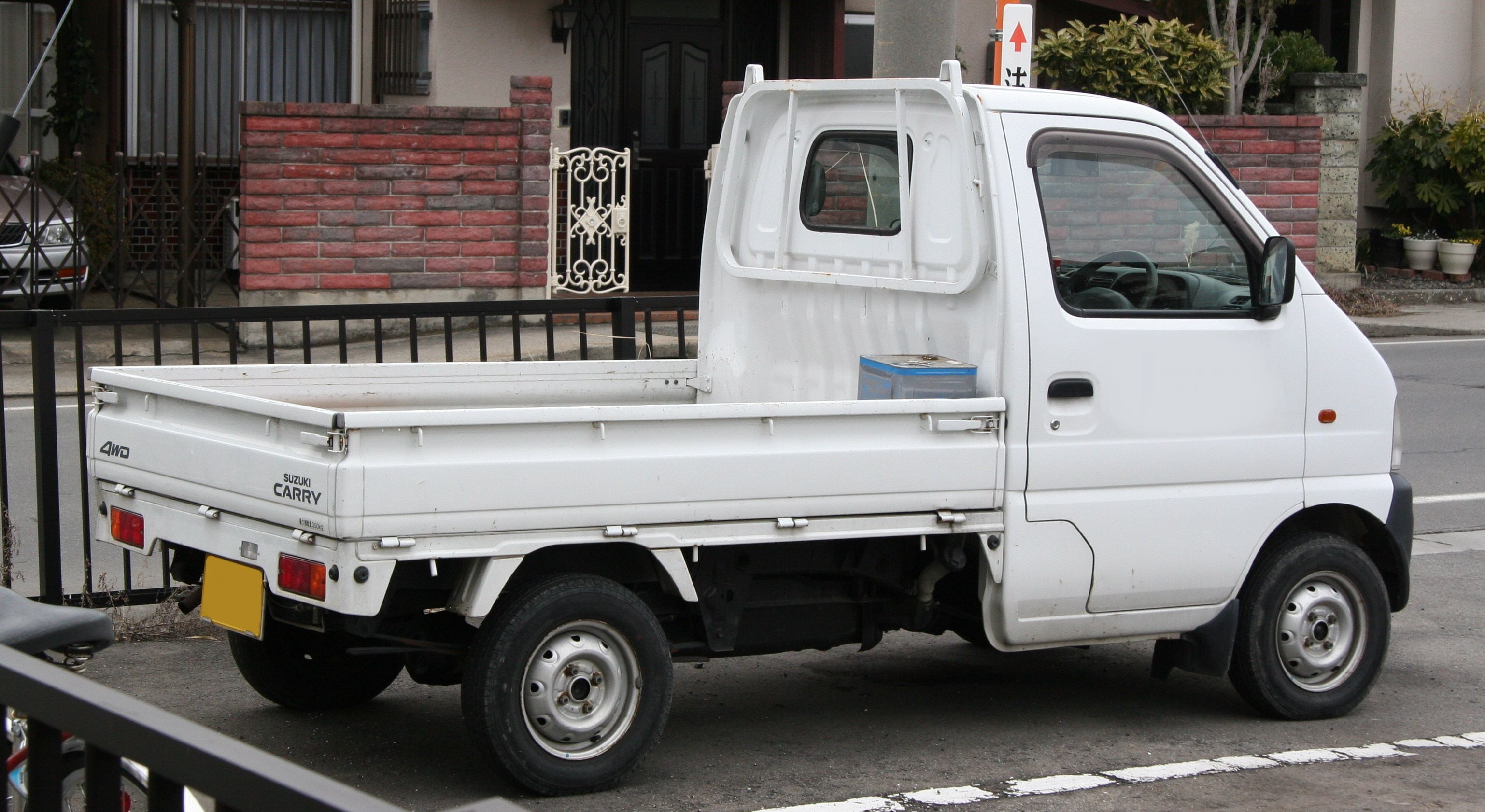
1999 Suzuki Carry truck

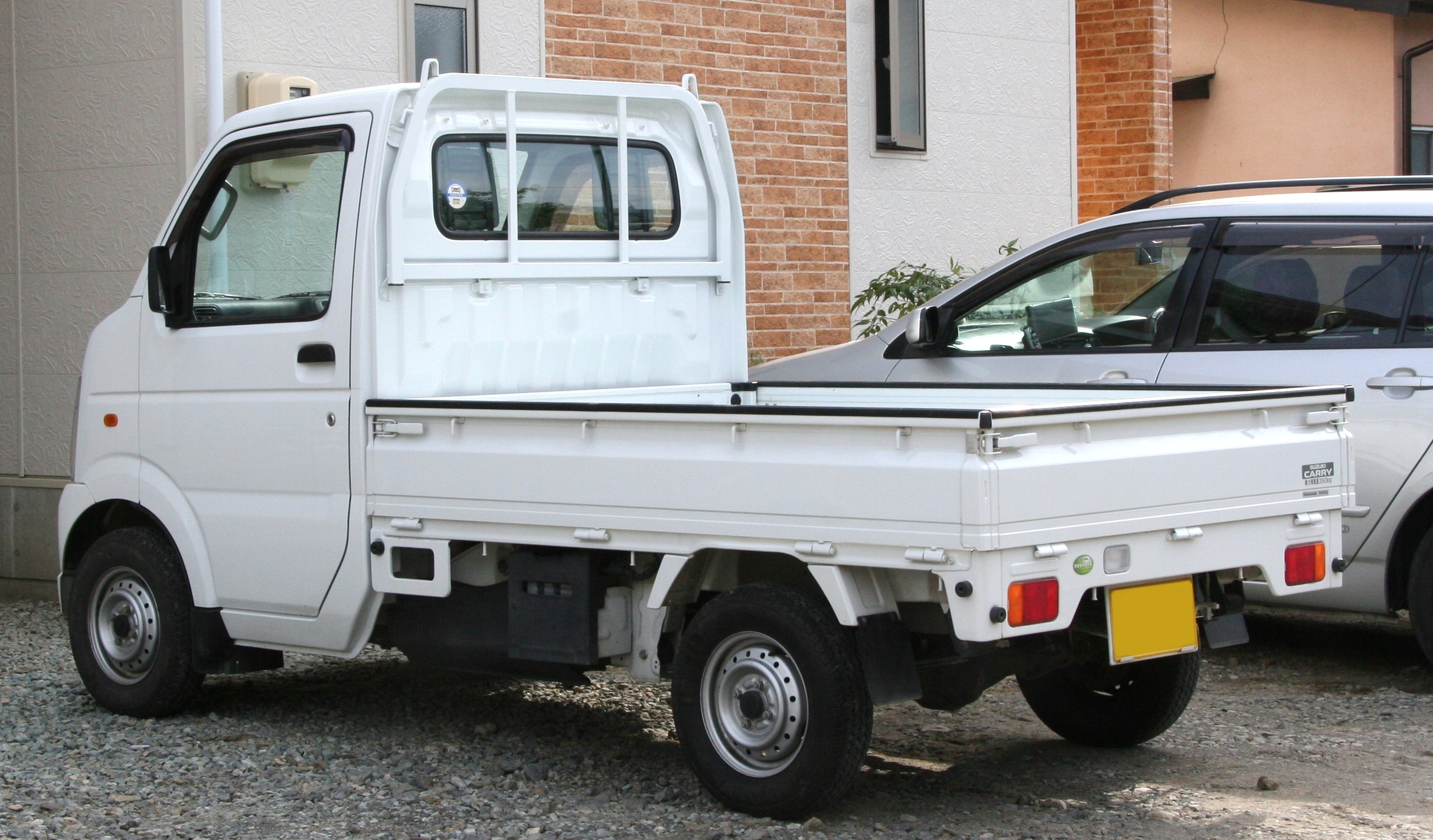
2002–2013 Suzuki Carry truck

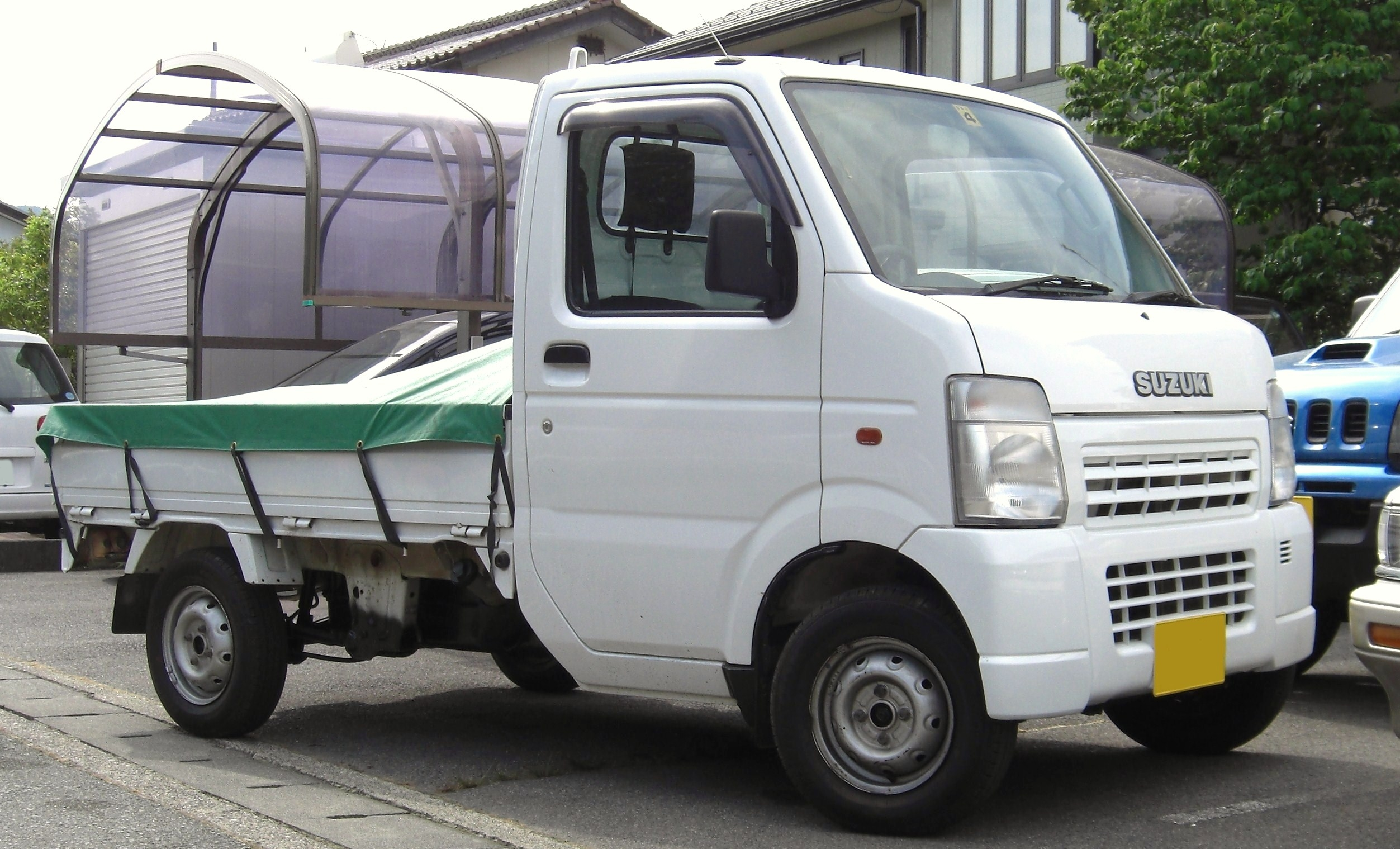
2002–2009 Suzuki Carry truck

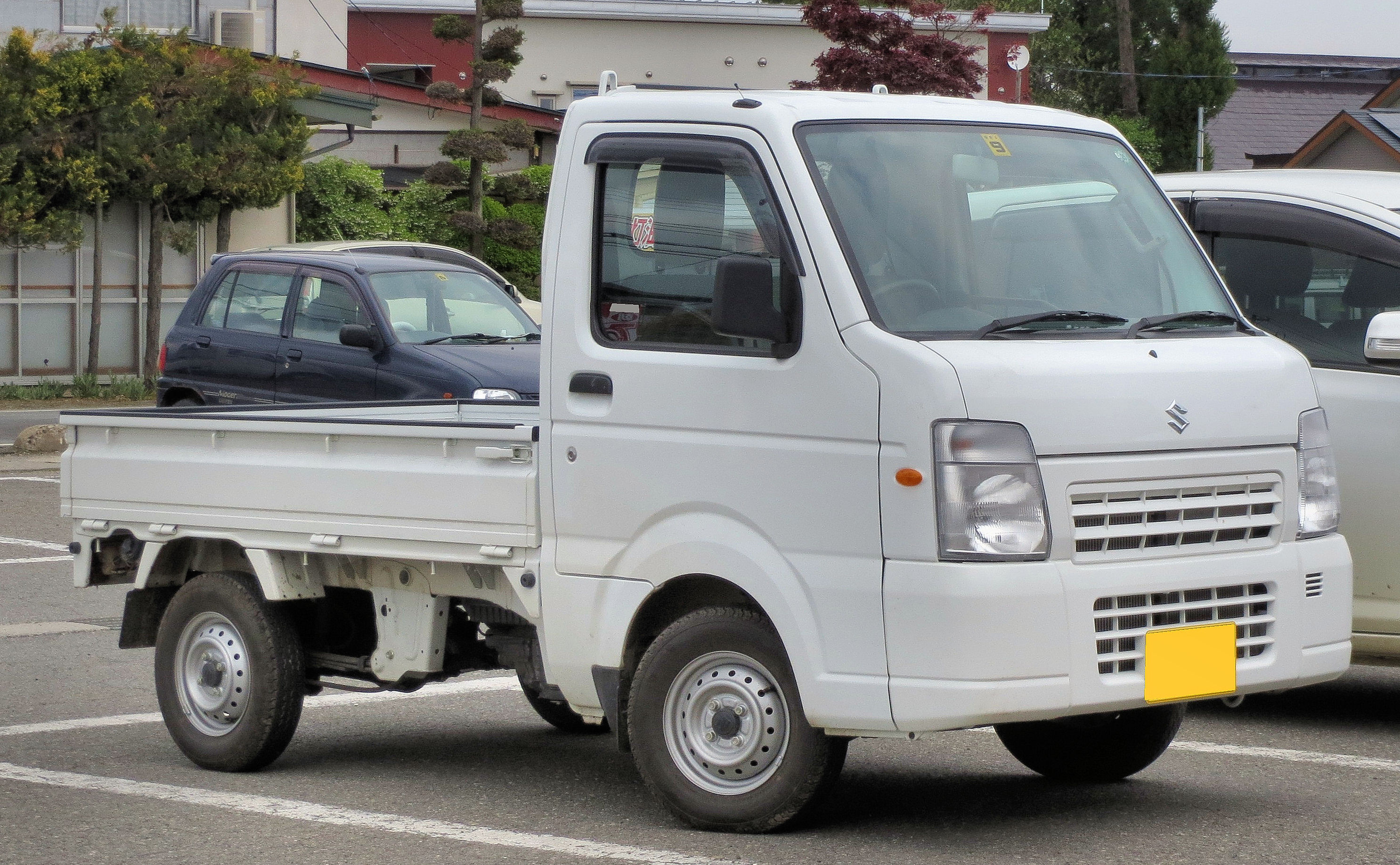
2005–2013 Suzuki Carry FC truck (short wheelbase)

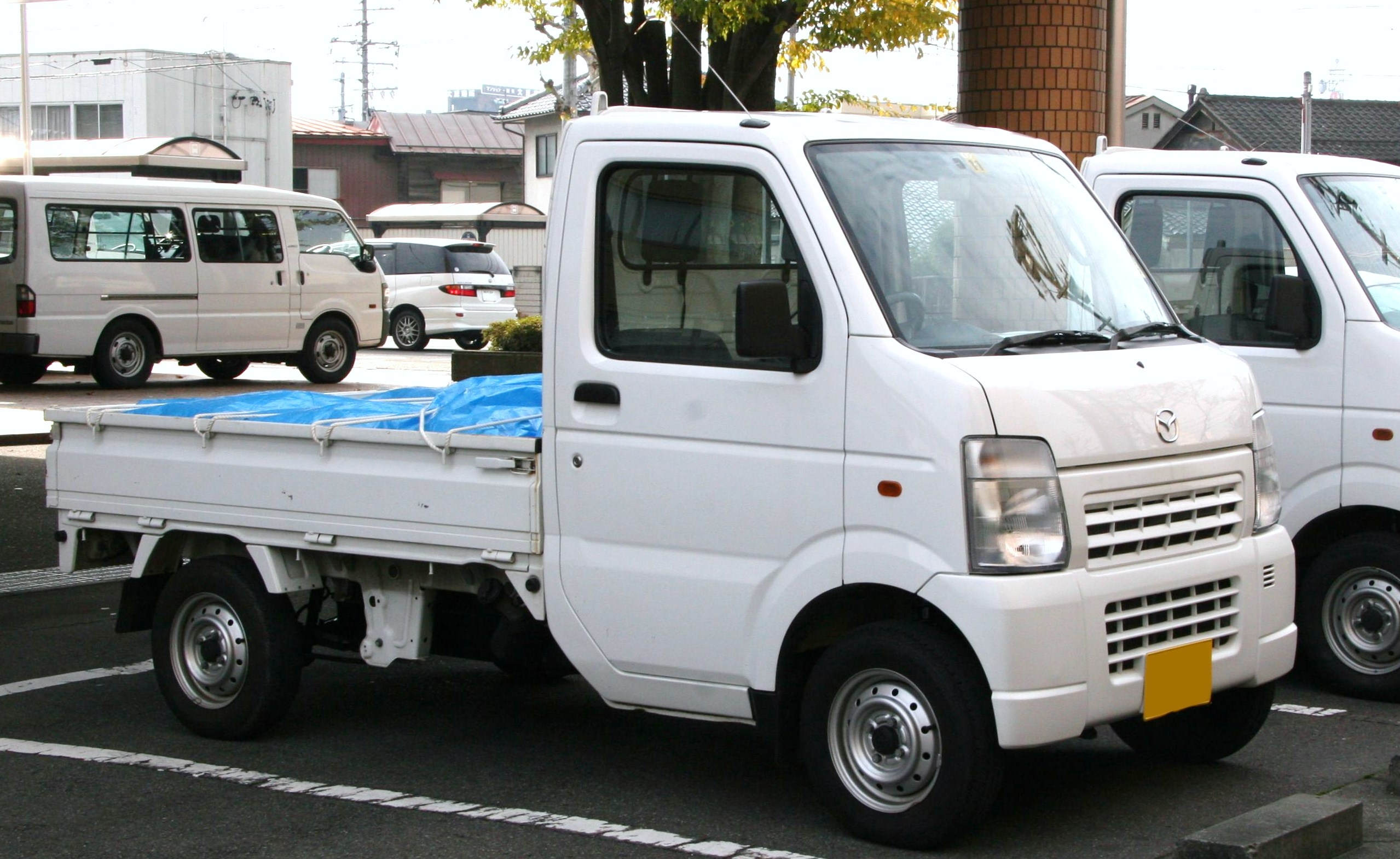
2002–2012 Mazda Scrum truck (third generation)

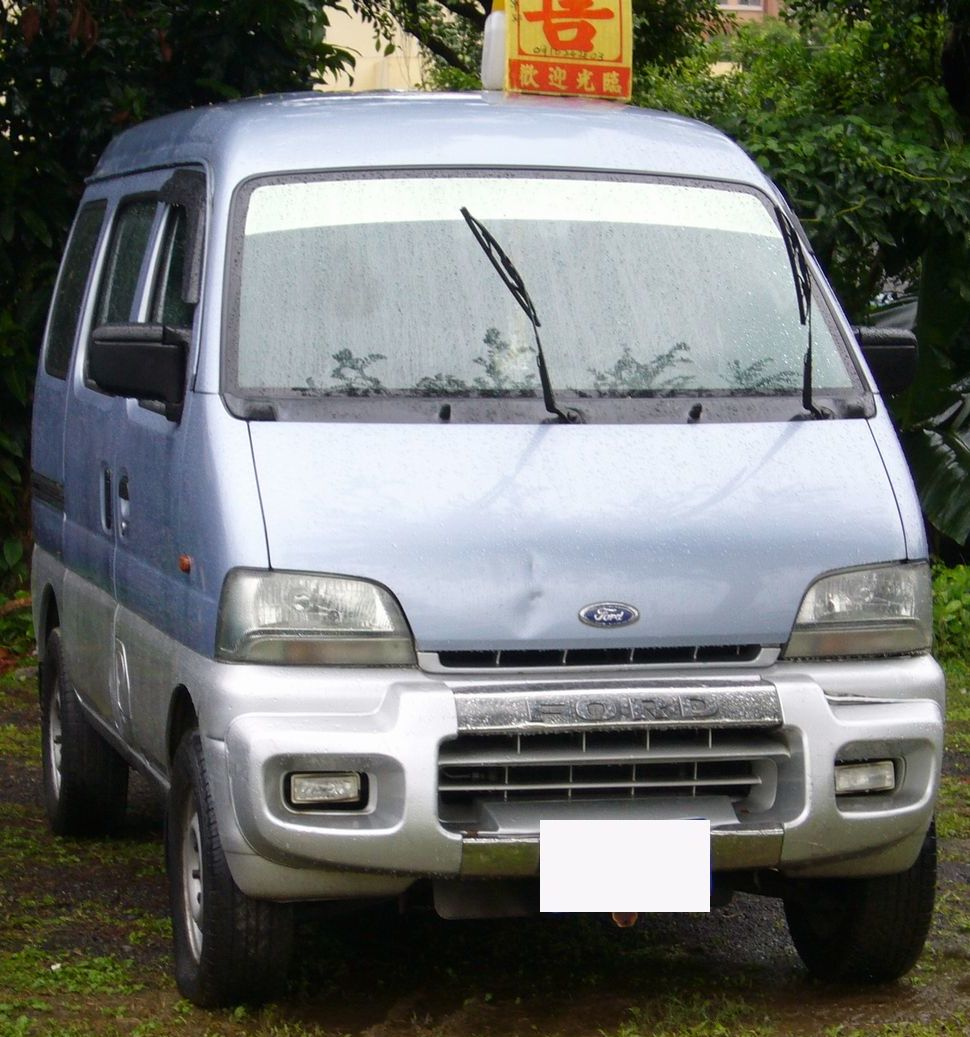
Ford Pronto PR-Z (Taiwan)

=== Ford Pronto (PR-Z) ===
This generation Carry was also built in Taiwan, as the Ford Pronto, starting in late November 1999. Available as a truck or a van, it was fitted with a Japanese-made 1-liter, 16-valve G10B engine producing 66 hp (49 kW). The more lifestyle-oriented van model was sold as the Pronto PR-Z. At the end of 2007, Ford Lio Ho ceased to produce the Pronto because the engine couldn't be made to meet revised local environmental regulations.

== Eleventh generation (2013) ==
Eleventh generation (DA16T)
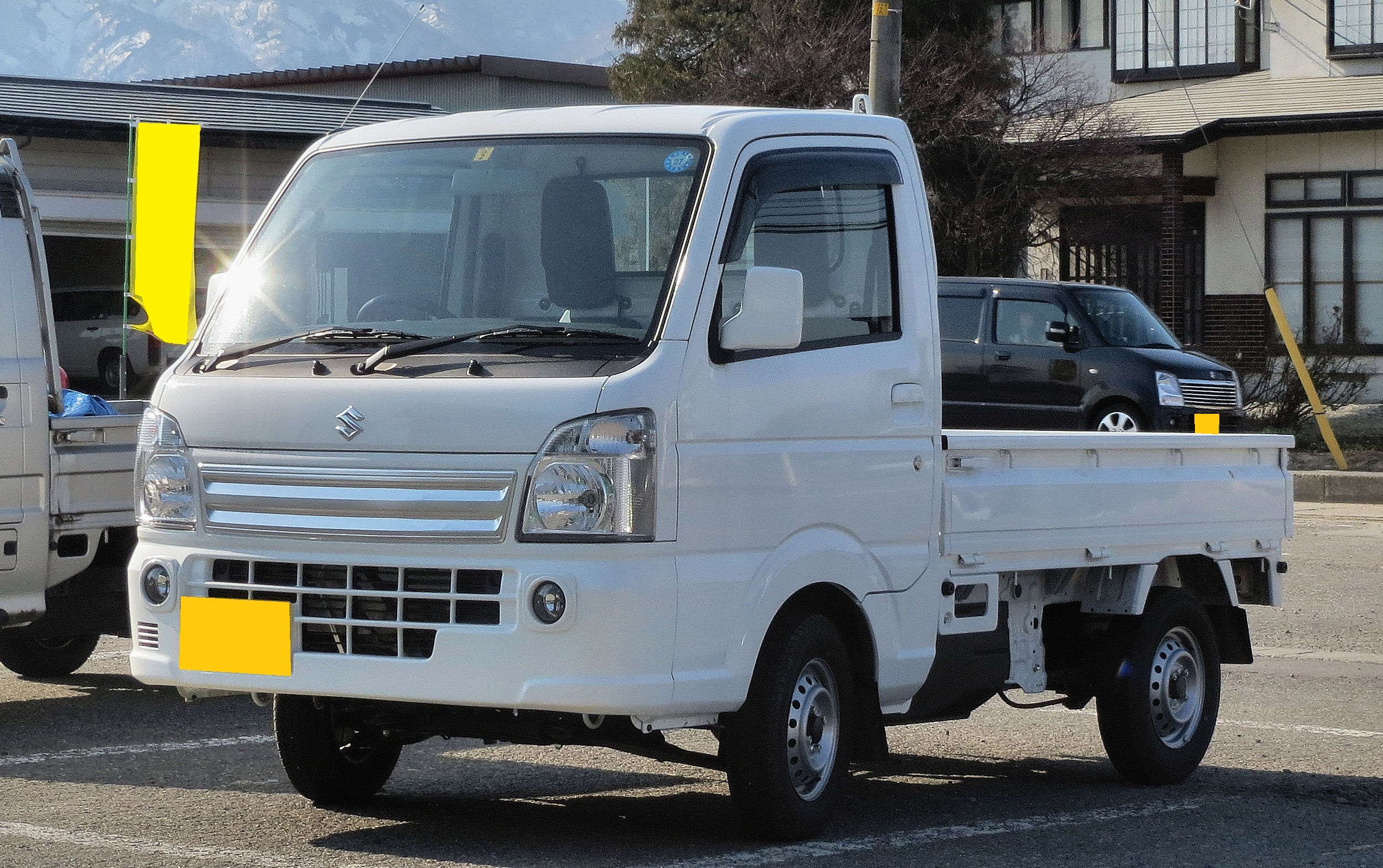
- Suzuki Carry KX 4WD truck (DA16T, pre-facelift)

Overview
- Also called: Mazda Scrum; Mitsubishi Minicab; Nissan NT100 Clipper (2013–2024); Nissan Clipper Truck (2024–present)
- Production: September 2013–present; May 2018–present (Super Carry)
- Assembly: Japan: Iwata, Shizuoka

Body and chassis
- Body style: 2-door pickup
- Layout: FMR layout, rear-wheel drive / four-wheel drive

Powertrain
- Engine: 658 cc R06A I3
- Transmission: 5-speed manual 3/4-speed automatic

Dimensions
- Wheelbase: 1,905 mm (75 in)
- Length: 3,395 mm (134 in)
- Width: 1,475 mm (58 in)
- Height: 1,765–1,885 mm (69–74 in)
- Curb weight: 680–850 kg (1,499–1,874 lb)

The eleventh generation Carry was introduced in Japan in August 2013. It is also sold as the Mazda Scrum, Mitsubishi Minicab, and Nissan Clipper.

A large-cabin variant called the Super Carry was released in May 2018. Previously the car was exhibited at the 2017 Tokyo Motor Show.

A major facelift occurred in December 2025. The front has been completely redesigned. LEDs are now standard on all models.

The interior now features a new 8-inch color LCD meter, and the instrument panel now features a digital meter display.

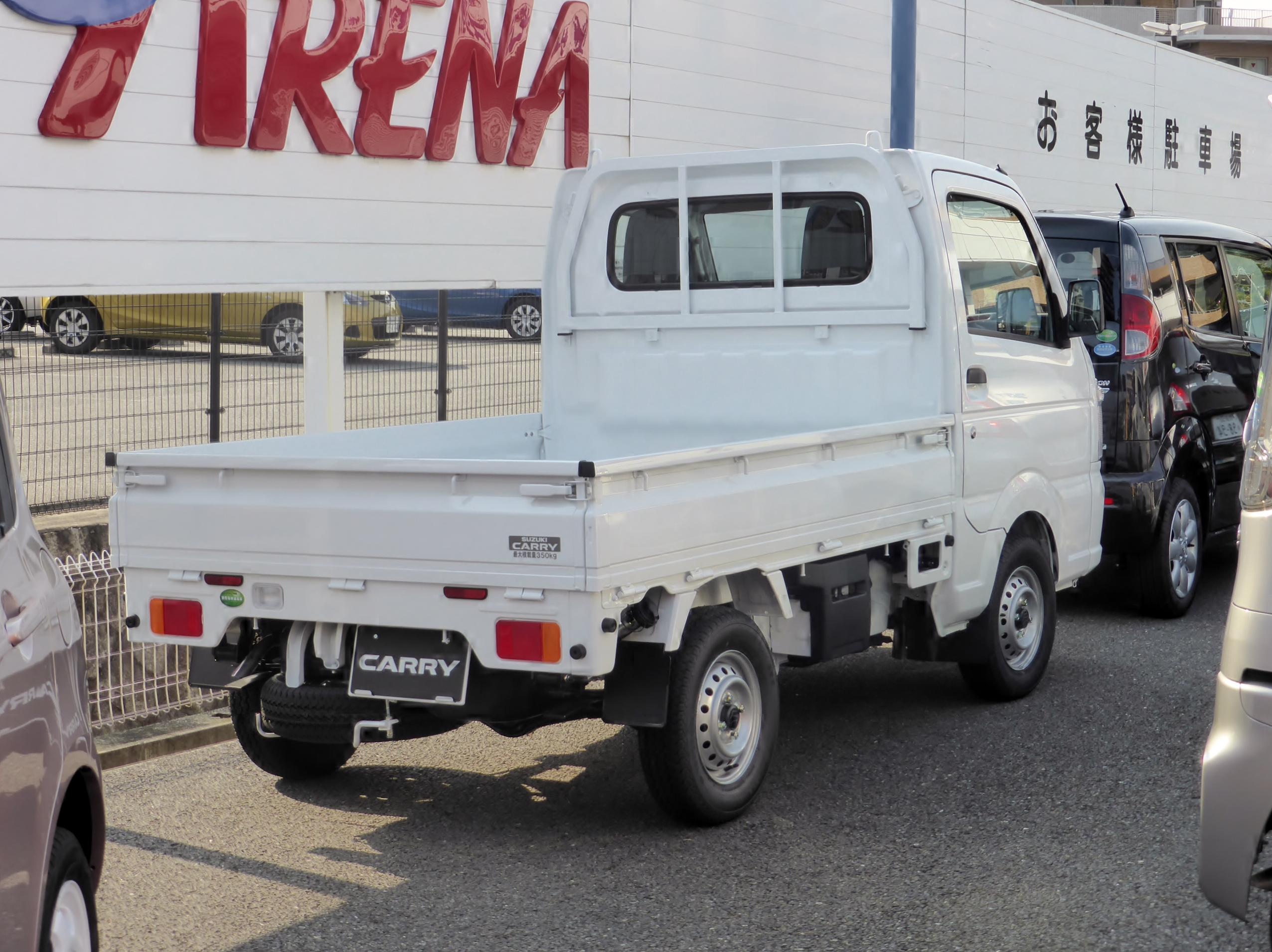
Suzuki Carry rear (DA16T)

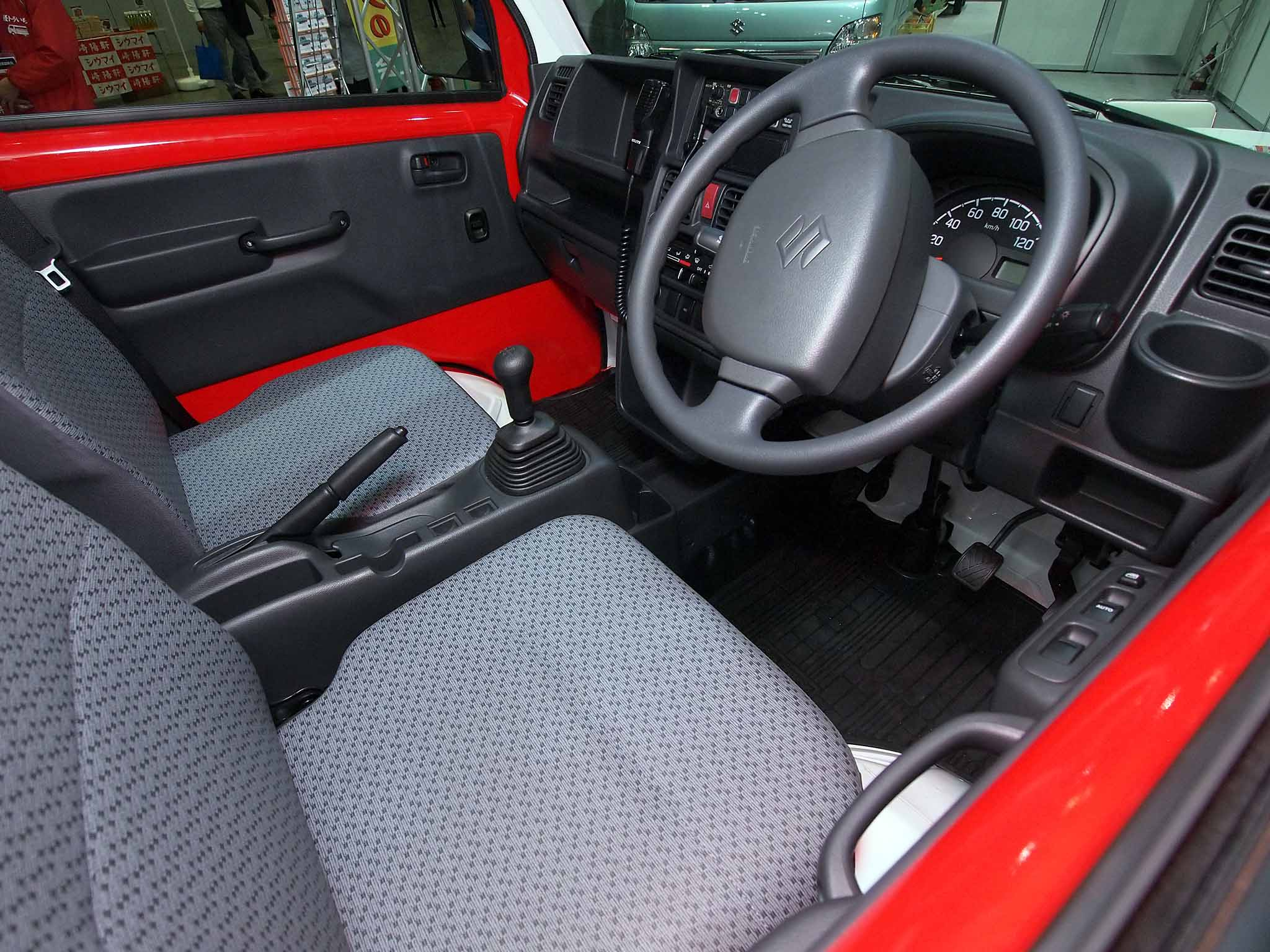
Interior

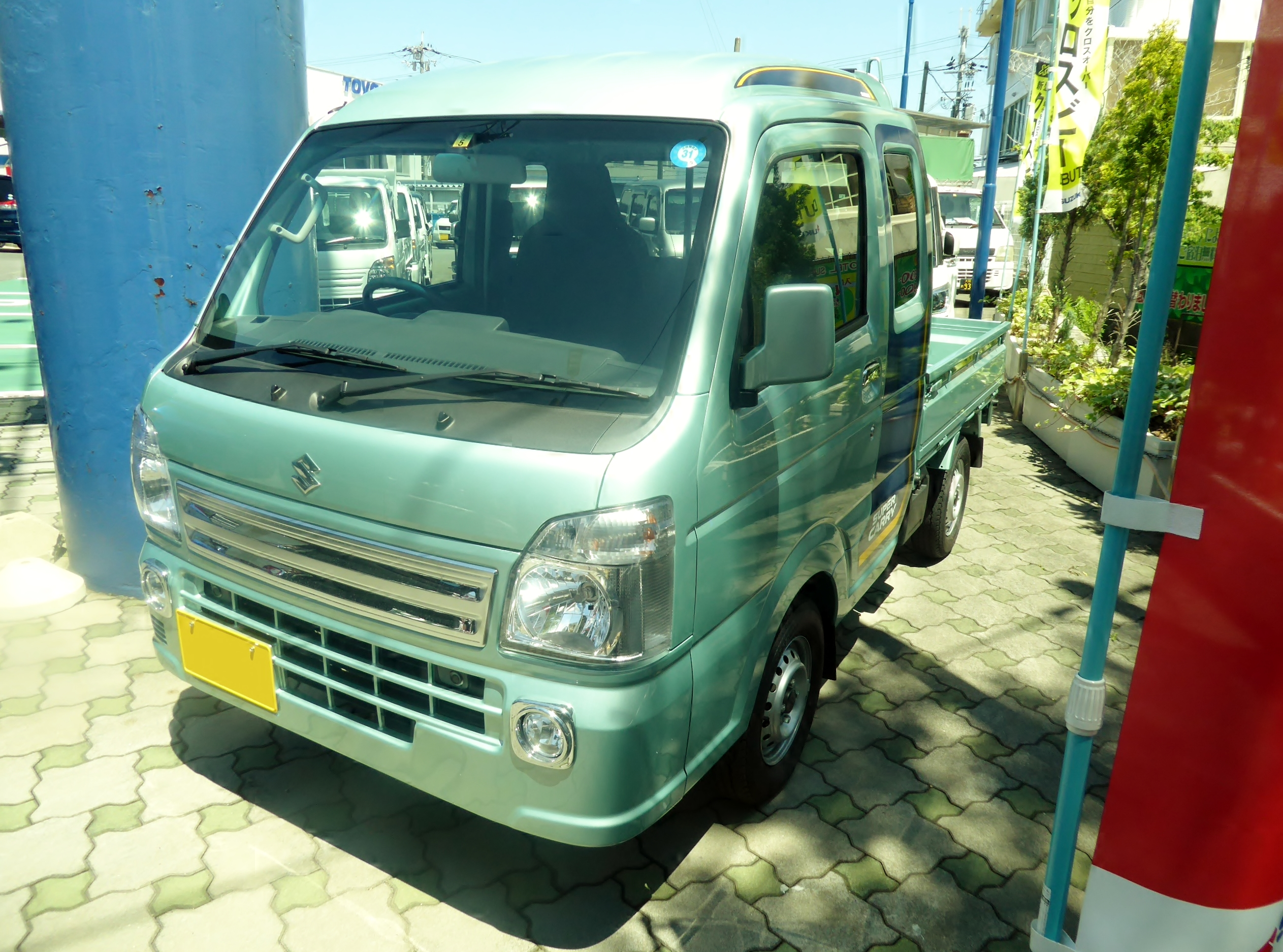
Suzuki Super Carry

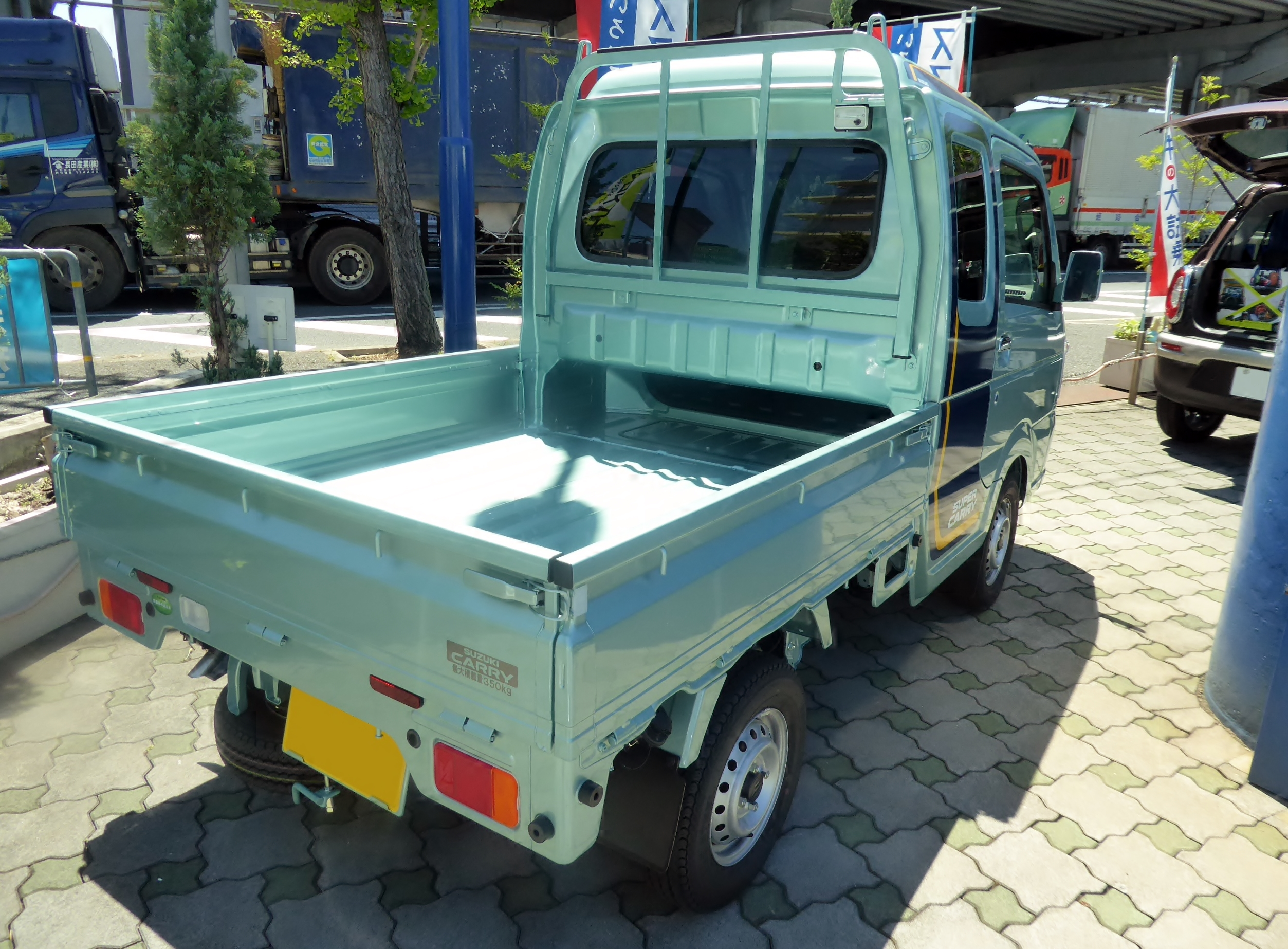
Suzuki Super Carry rear

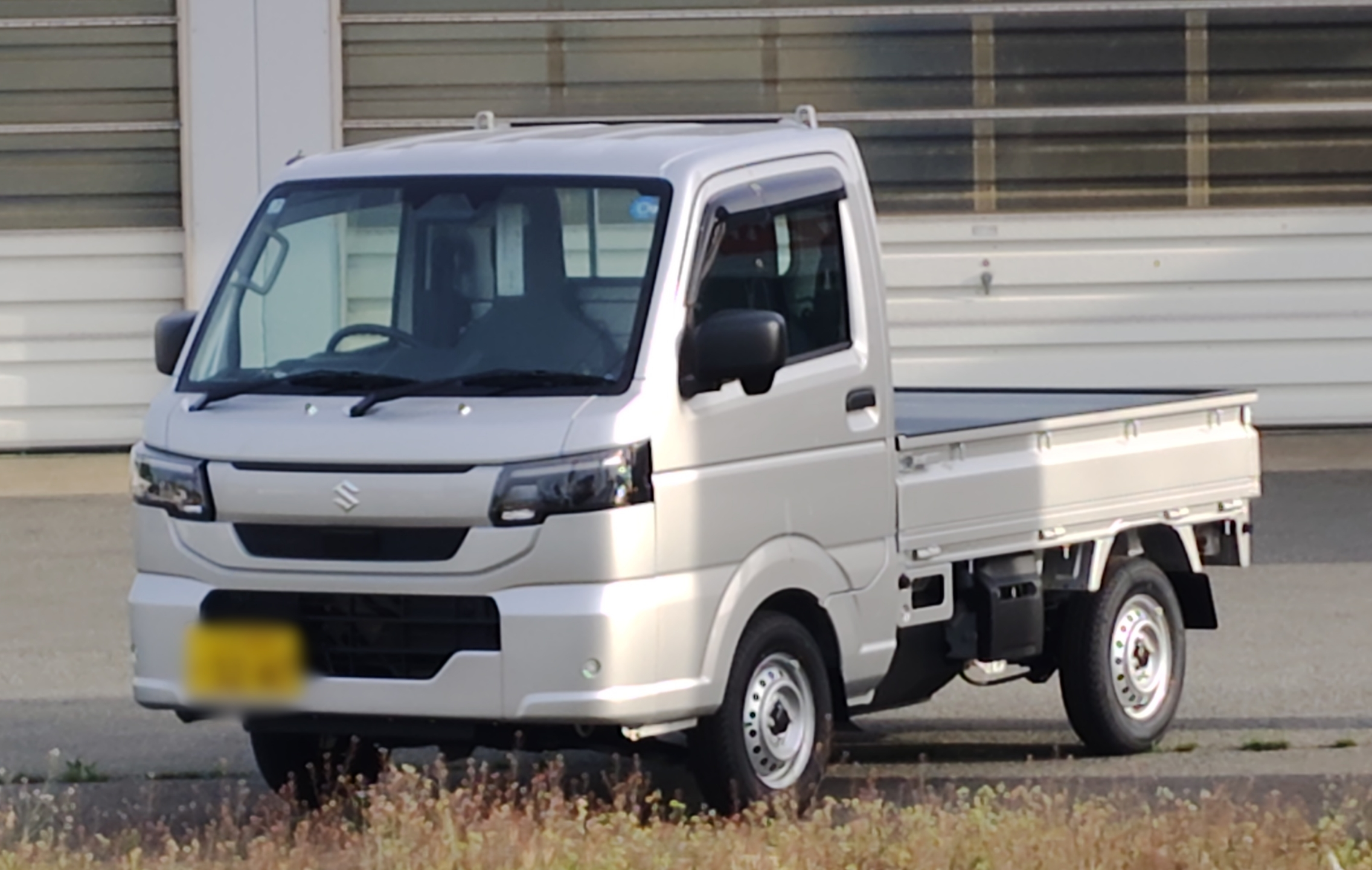
Suzuki Carry KC 4WD truck (DA16T, facelift)

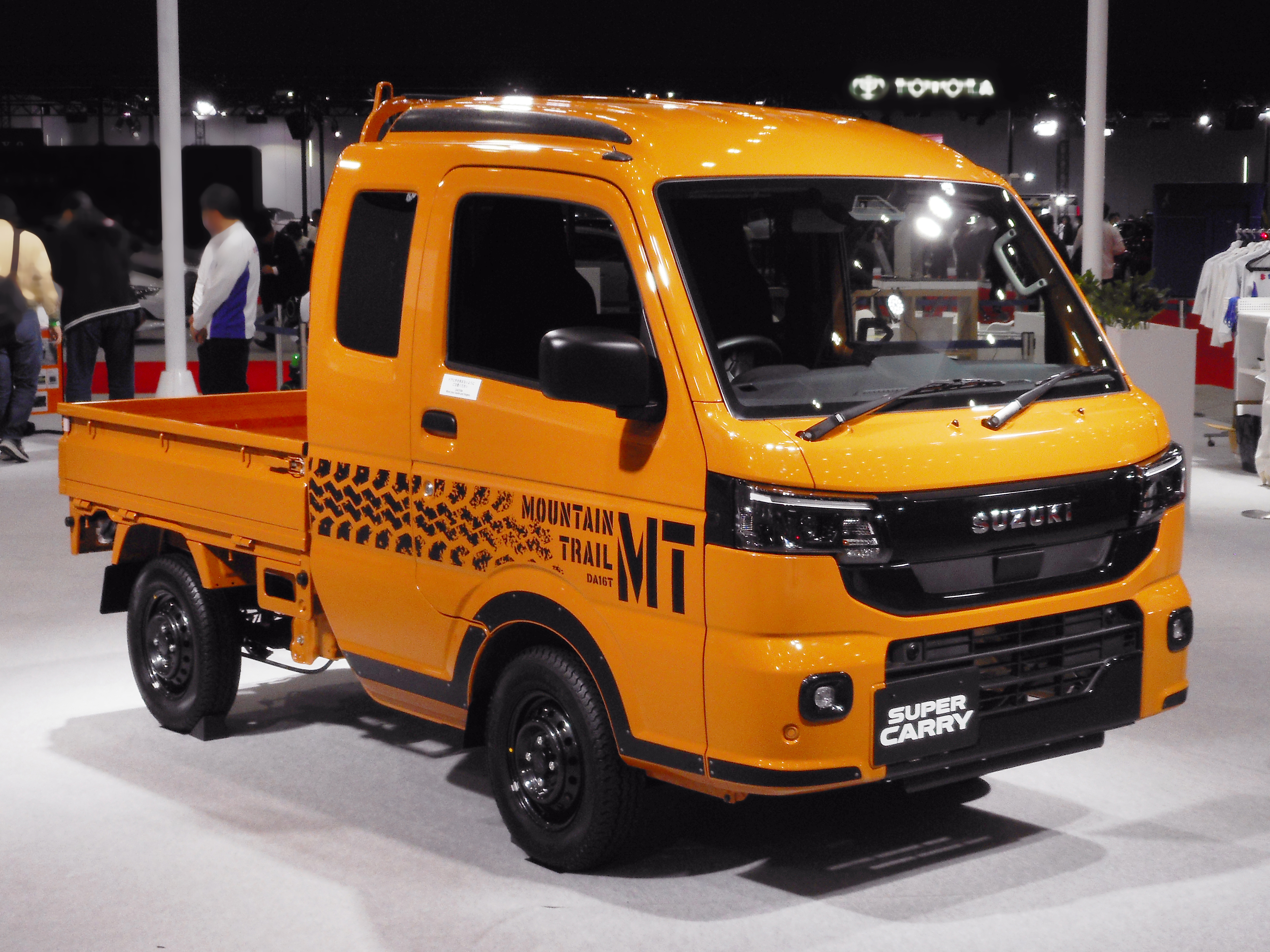
2025 Suzuki Super Carry X Limited (facelift)

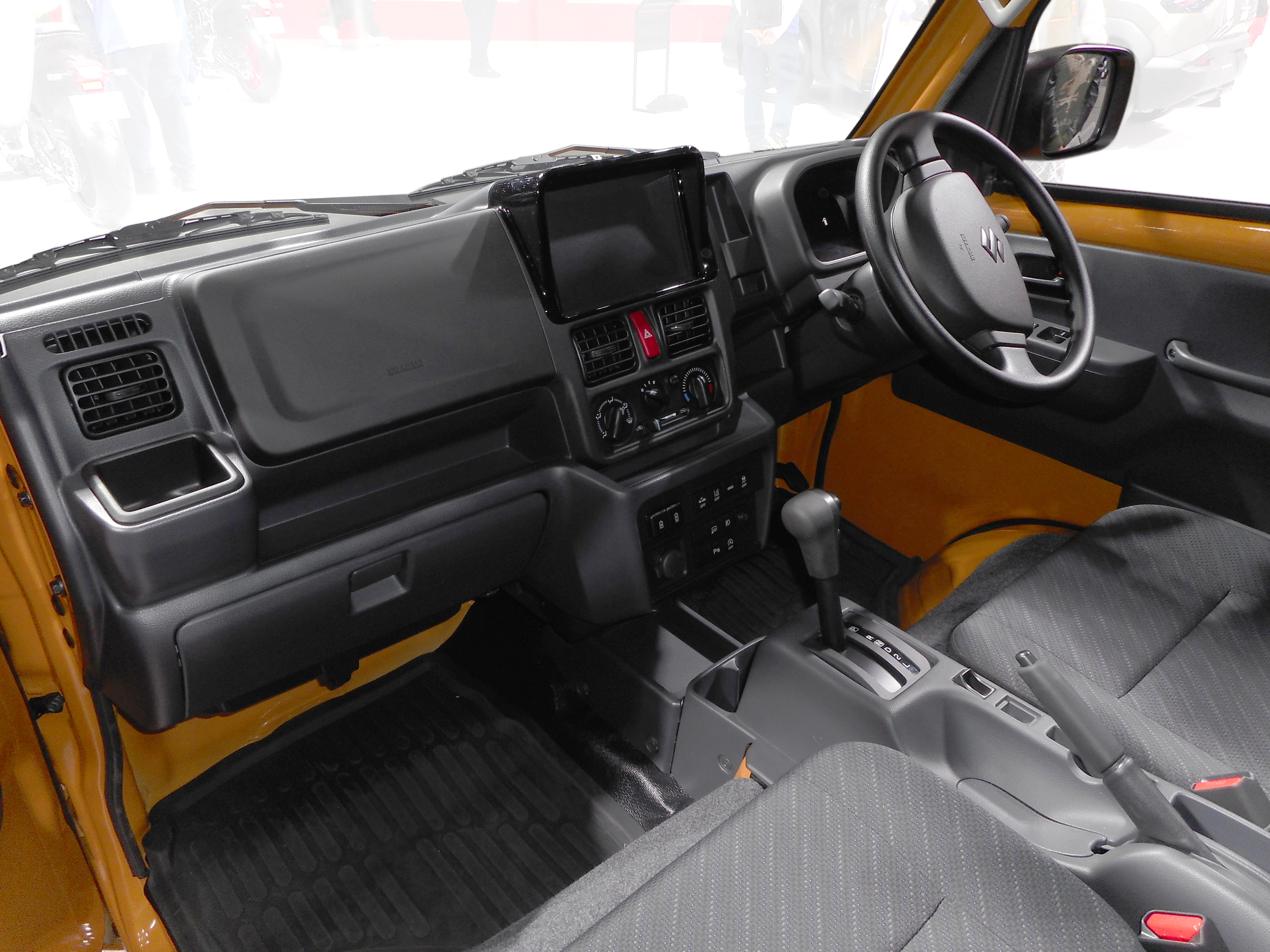
Carry Interior (facelift)

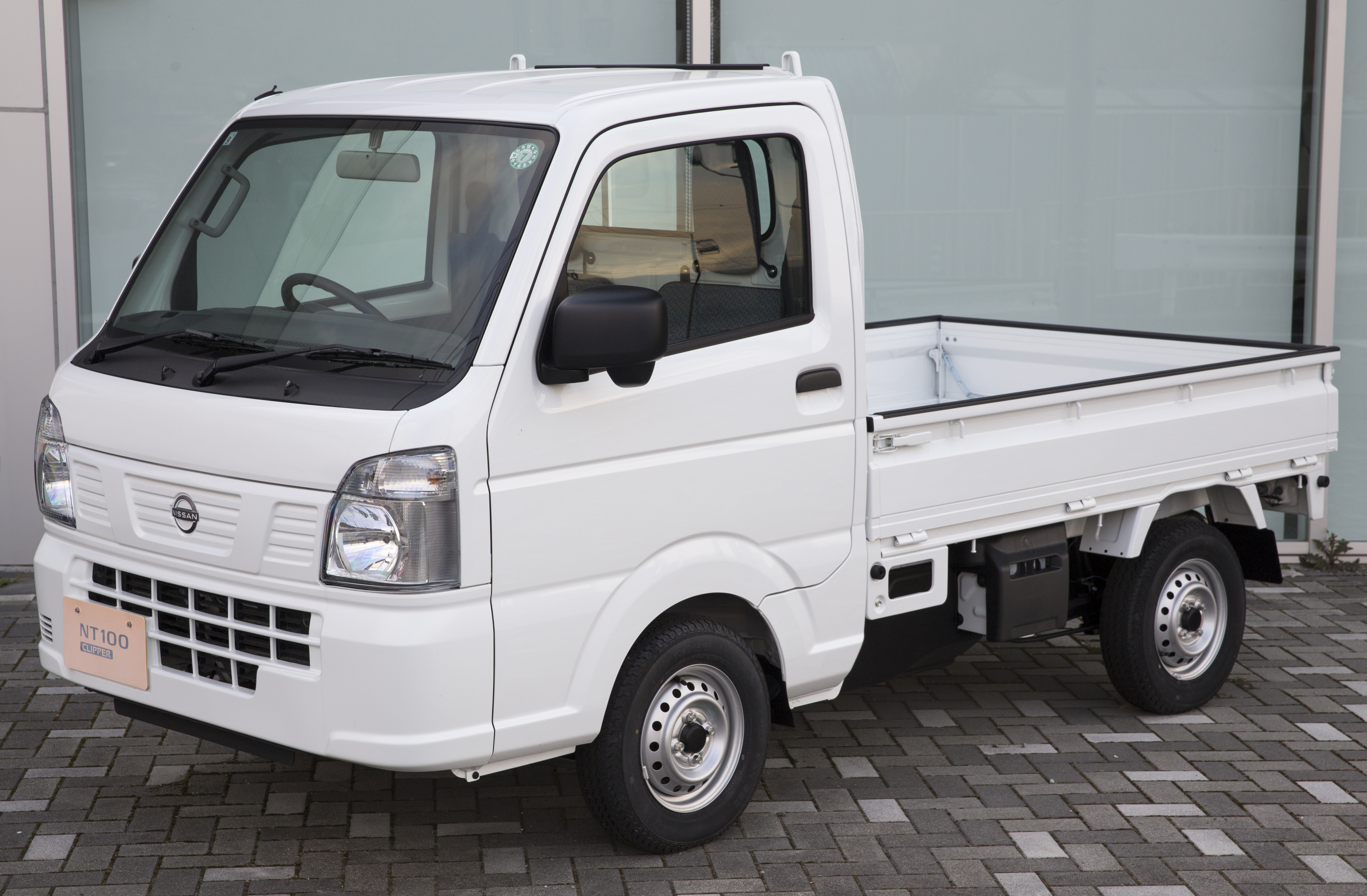
The Nissan NT100 Clipper; identical aside from the grille and badging

== Separate models ==
Suzuki also developed several non-kei car version of Carrys for different markets around the world.

=== Suzuki Carry Futura/Suzuki Futura/Super Carry ===
Suzuki Carry Futura/Suzuki Futura/Super Carry
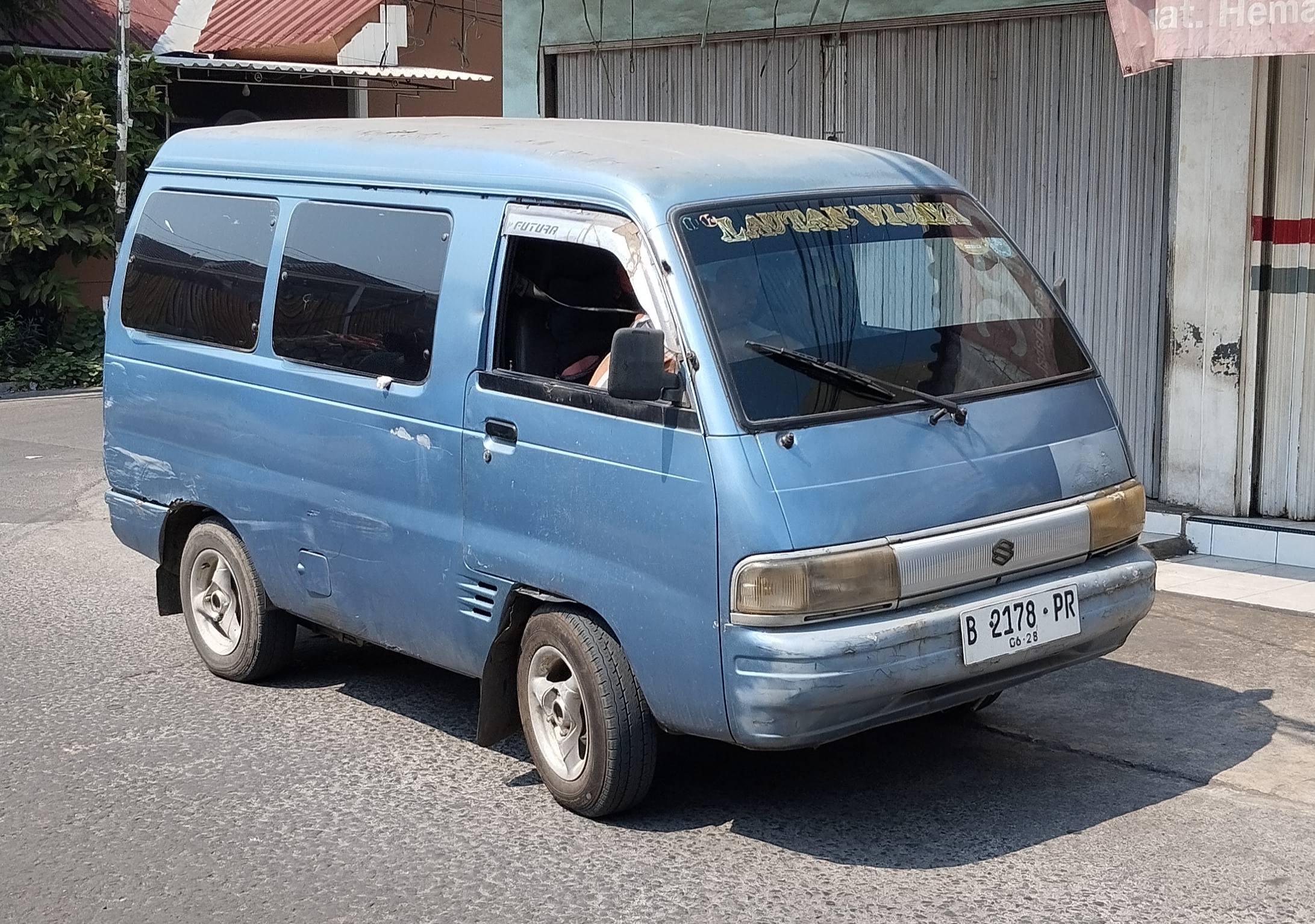
- Suzuki Carry Futura 1.3 van (SL413; pre-facelift)

Overview
- Also called: Suzuki Futura (Indonesia and Malaysia); Mitsubishi Colt T120SS (Indonesia); Maruti Suzuki Super Carry (India)
- Production: 1991–2019 (Indonesia); 2015–present (India)
- Assembly: Indonesia: Bekasi, West Java (Suzuki Indomobil Motor); Pulo Gadung, East Jakarta (PT Krama Yudha Ratu Motor); India: Gurgaon, Haryana (Maruti Suzuki)

Body and chassis
- Body style: 2-door pickup; 2-door chassis cab; 3-door utility van (Philippines); 4-door van (Carry Futura)
- Layout: Front mid-engine, rear-wheel-drive

Powertrain
- Engine: Carry Futura: 1360 cc G13C I4; 1493 cc G15A I4; 1590 cc G16A I4; Super Carry: 793 cc E08A DDiS I2-TD; 1196 cc G12C I4; 1197 cc K12N Dualjet I4; Colt T120SS: 1343 cc 4G17 I4; 1468 cc 4G15 I4
- Transmission: 5-speed manual

Dimensions
- Wheelbase: 1,970 mm (78 in); 2,110 mm (83 in) (Super Carry)
- Length: 3,720–3,940 mm (146–155 in) (truck); 3,875 mm (153 in) (van)
- Width: 1,560–1,720 mm (61–68 in) (truck); 1,570 mm (62 in) (van)
- Height: 1,825–1,910 mm (72–75 in); 1,915 mm (75 in) (van)
- Curb weight: 790–1,050 kg (1,742–2,315 lb)

Chronology
- Predecessor: Mitsubishi Jetstar (Colt T120SS)
- Successor: Suzuki Carry (DC/DN61T) (pickup); Suzuki APV (van; upmarket variant)

In April 1989, Suzuki reaches an agreement with Mitsubishi for joint development of light commercial vehicle in Indonesia. Those light commercial vehicles were later introduced as Suzuki Carry Futura (later just Suzuki Futura when the 'Carry' nameplate was dropped in 1994 to distinguish with the ST100 Suzuki Carry 1.0) and Mitsubishi Colt T120SS, the former debuted first in mid-February 1991. Instead of positioned as the successor of the older Carry ST100, the Futura was sold together as the bigger alternative of Carry in Indonesia and also available as 4-door van, wide deck truck with three-way opening and bare chassis. The bare chassis version is usually converted into a microbus by local bodybuilders, for use as an angkot, or share taxi like the older Carry ST100. Initially it has a 1,360 cc G13C engine with ST130/SL413 internal model codename. The engine was based on G13A engine but with bigger bore and developed exclusively for Futura. The engine's power was rated at 73 PS (54 kW) at 6000 rpm. The truck was also sold in Malaysia as Suzuki Futura, again without the Carry nameplate. As of April 1995, along with the ST100 Suzuki Carry 1.0, the Futura received update on the redesigned steering wheel with Suzuki S logo, as well as the usage of power steering on the Futura.

A minor facelift occurred in August 1997 along with the introduction of the 1,590 cc G16A engine option (ST160/SL416); this puts out 80 PS (59 kW). In 2000, the 1,493 cc G15A engine (ST150/SL415) replaced both the 1.3 and 1.6 engines, as the Indonesian government imposed higher tax for engine above 1500 cc in 2000 and also as an efficiency strategy after the 1997 Asian financial crisis. The original, carburetted engine produces 77 PS (57 kW) at 6000 rpm. In March 2005, the 1.5 engine was upgraded to fuel injection rather than the earlier carburettor due to the implementation of the Euro 2 emission standard, the cylinder head was also updated from 8 to 16-valve. This engine initially produced 87 PS (64 kW), but later detuned to 79 PS (58 kW). Two more facelifts occurred, in April 2010 and again in January 2017. The Futura (and the bigger APV-based Mega Carry truck) was discontinued in February 2019 due to the implementation of Euro 4 emission standard and replaced by newer Carry (DC/DN61T) few months later.

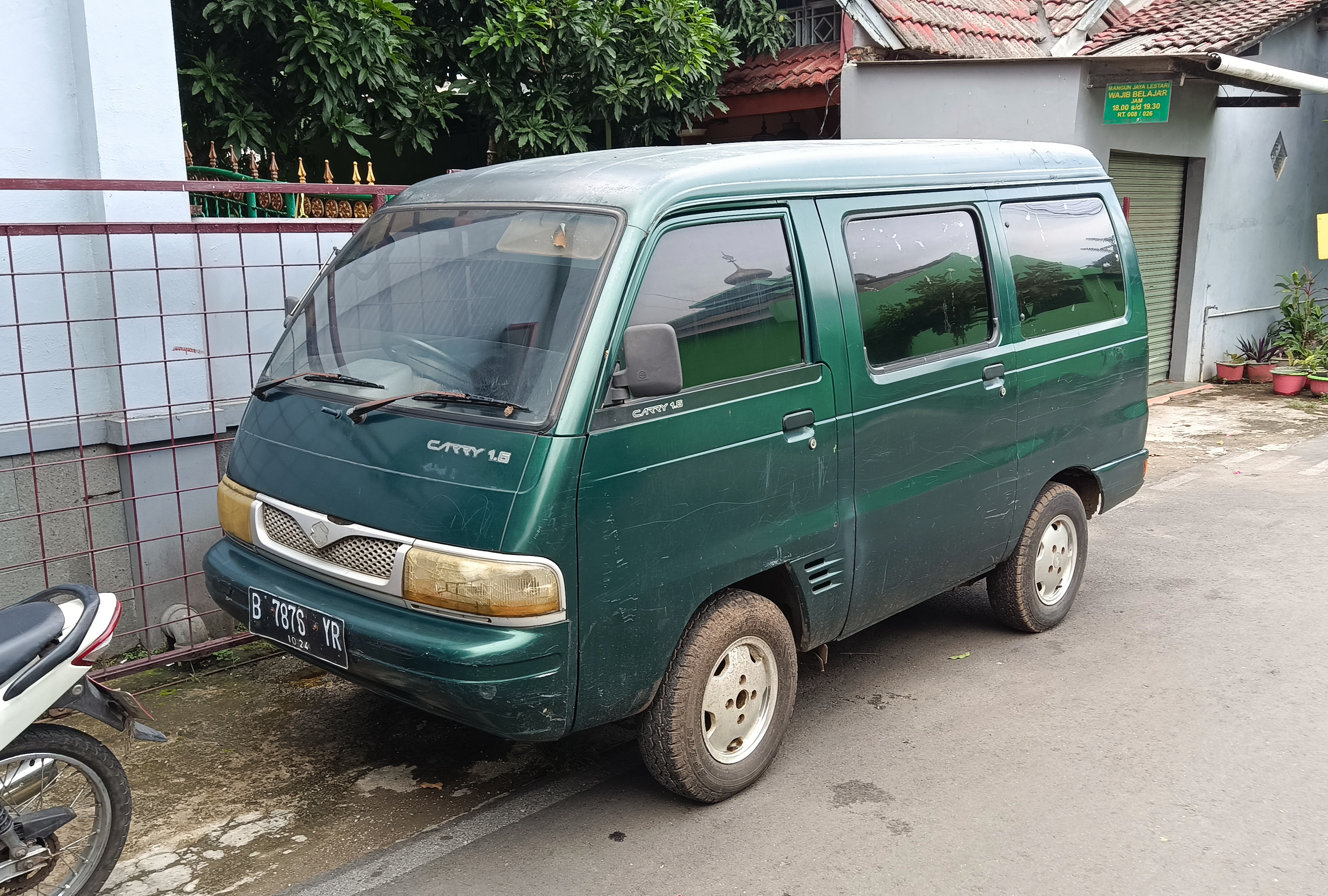
Suzuki Carry Futura 1.6 van (SL416; 1999 facelift)

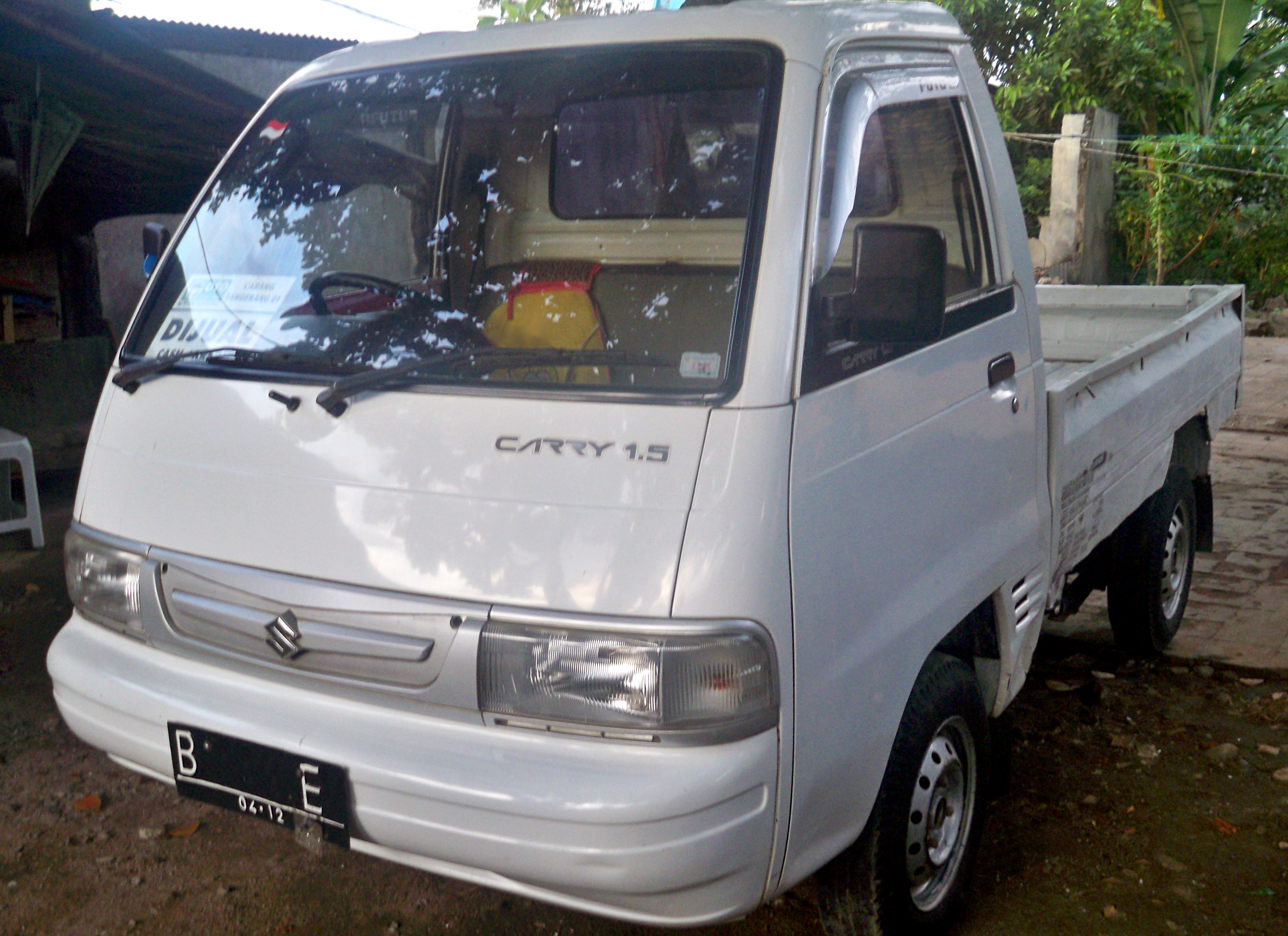
Suzuki Carry Futura 1.5 flat deck truck (SL415; 2005 facelift)

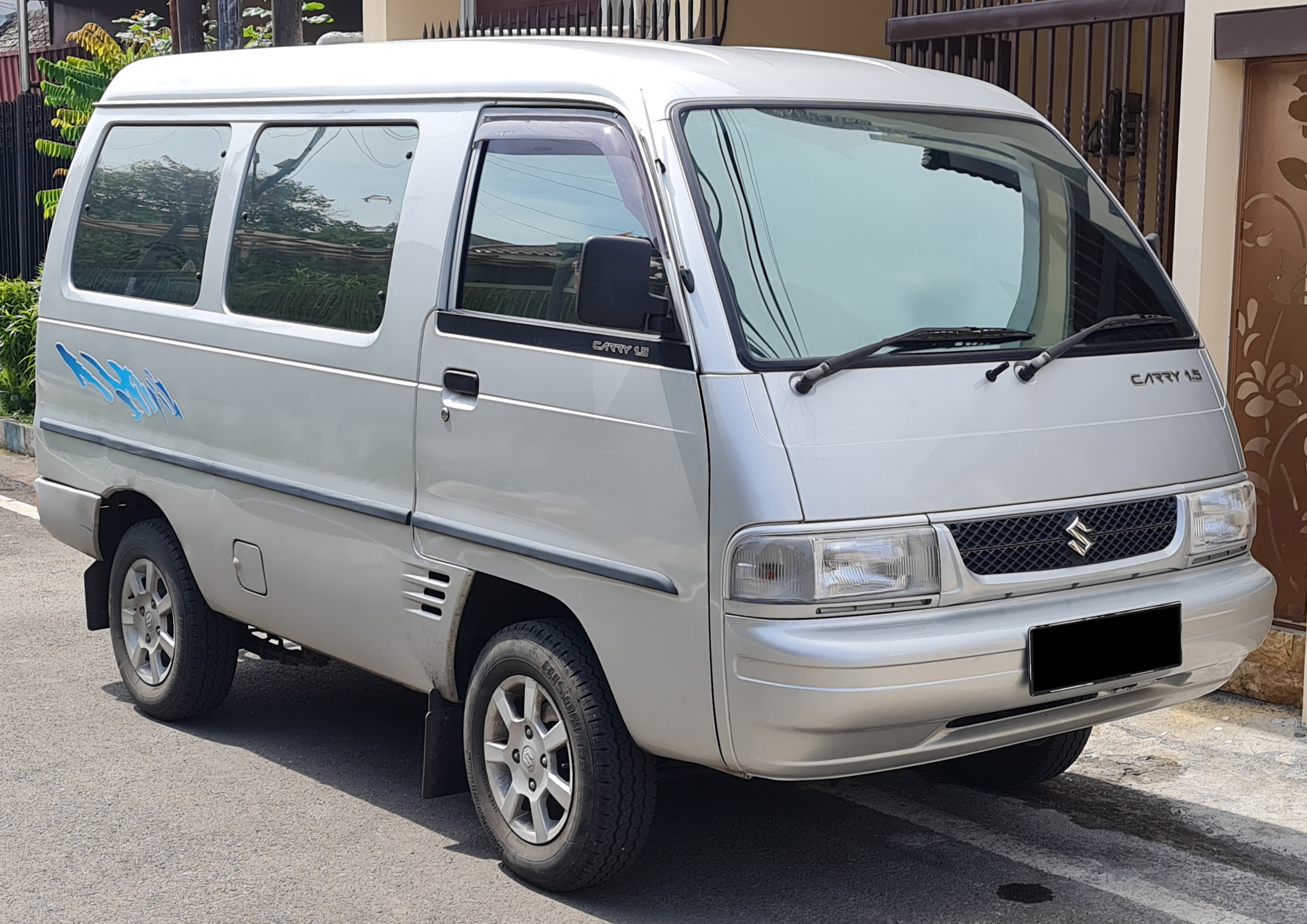
Suzuki Carry Futura 1.5 GX van (SL415; 2010 facelift)

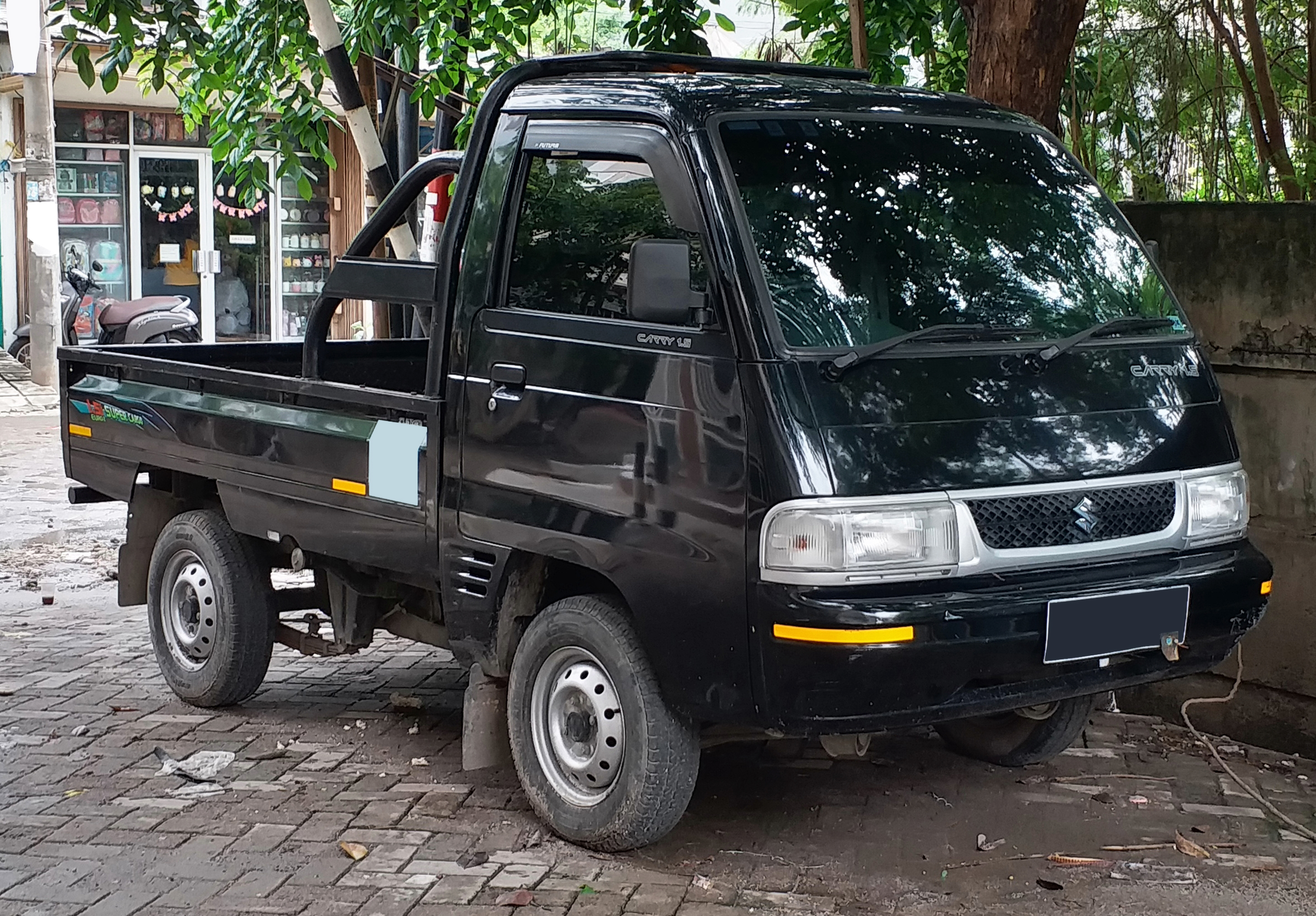
Suzuki Carry Futura 1.5 flat deck truck (SL415; 2010 facelift)

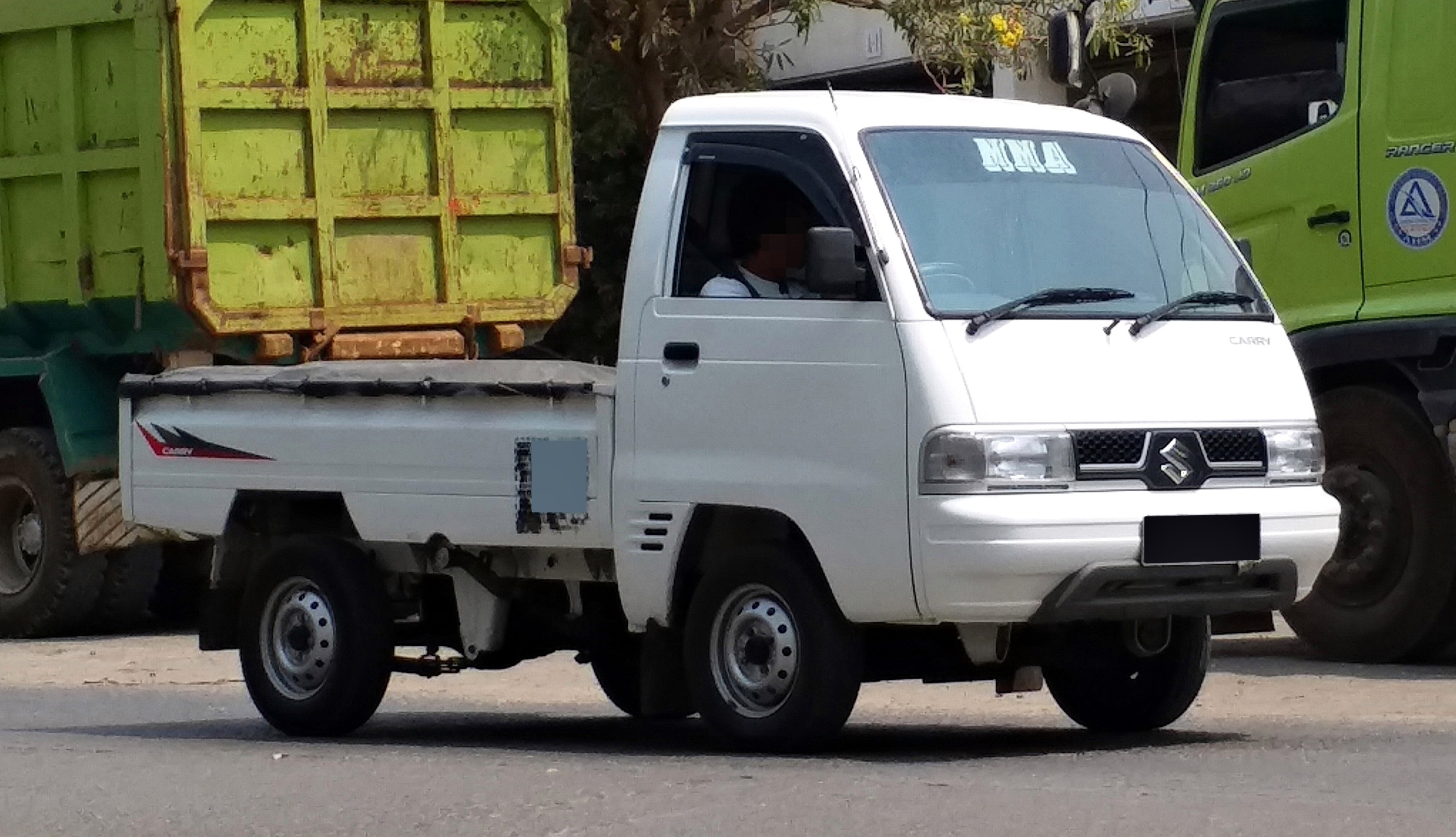
Suzuki Carry Futura 1.5 flat deck truck (SL415; 2017 facelift)

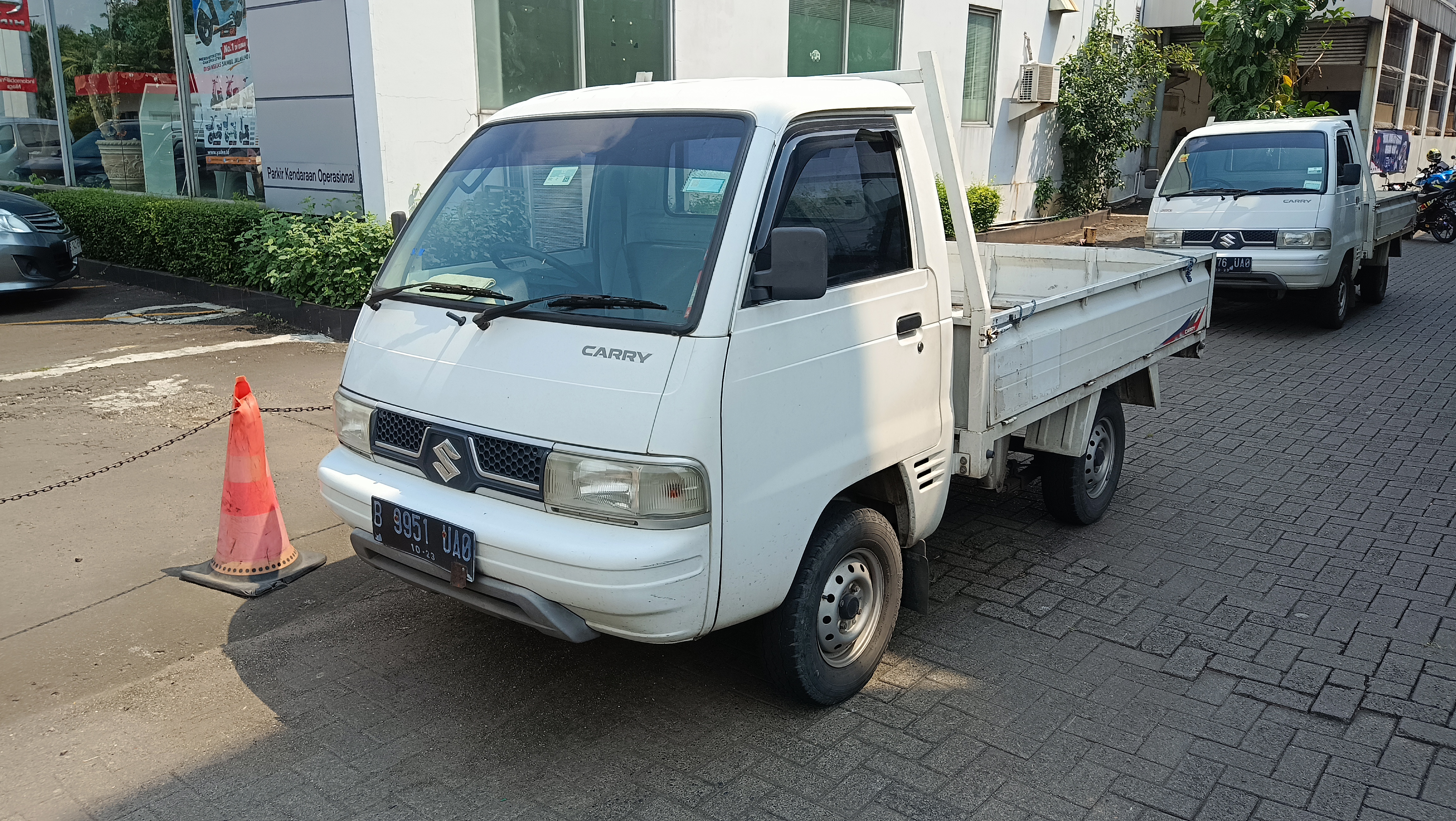
Wide deck truck version

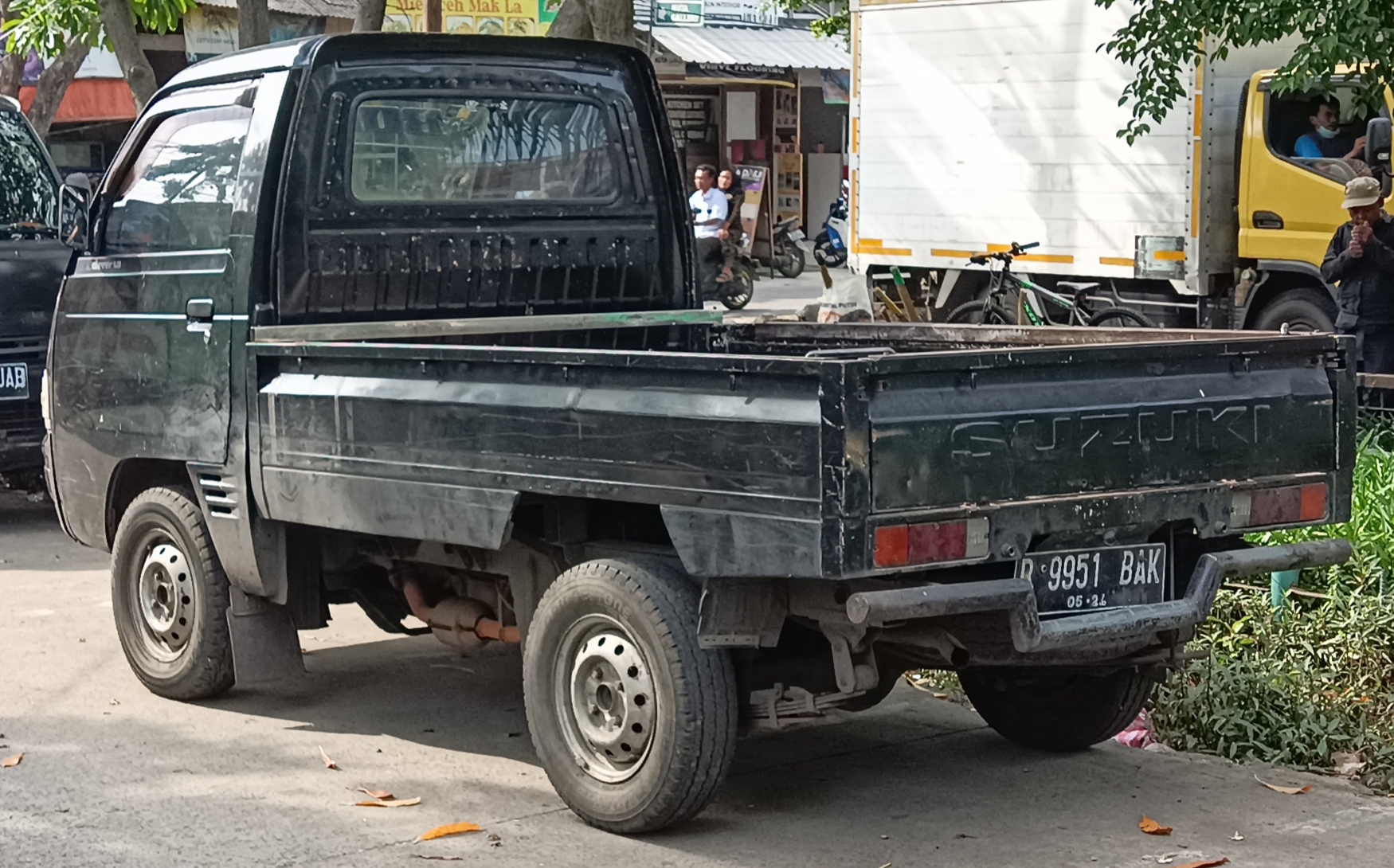
Rear view of the truck

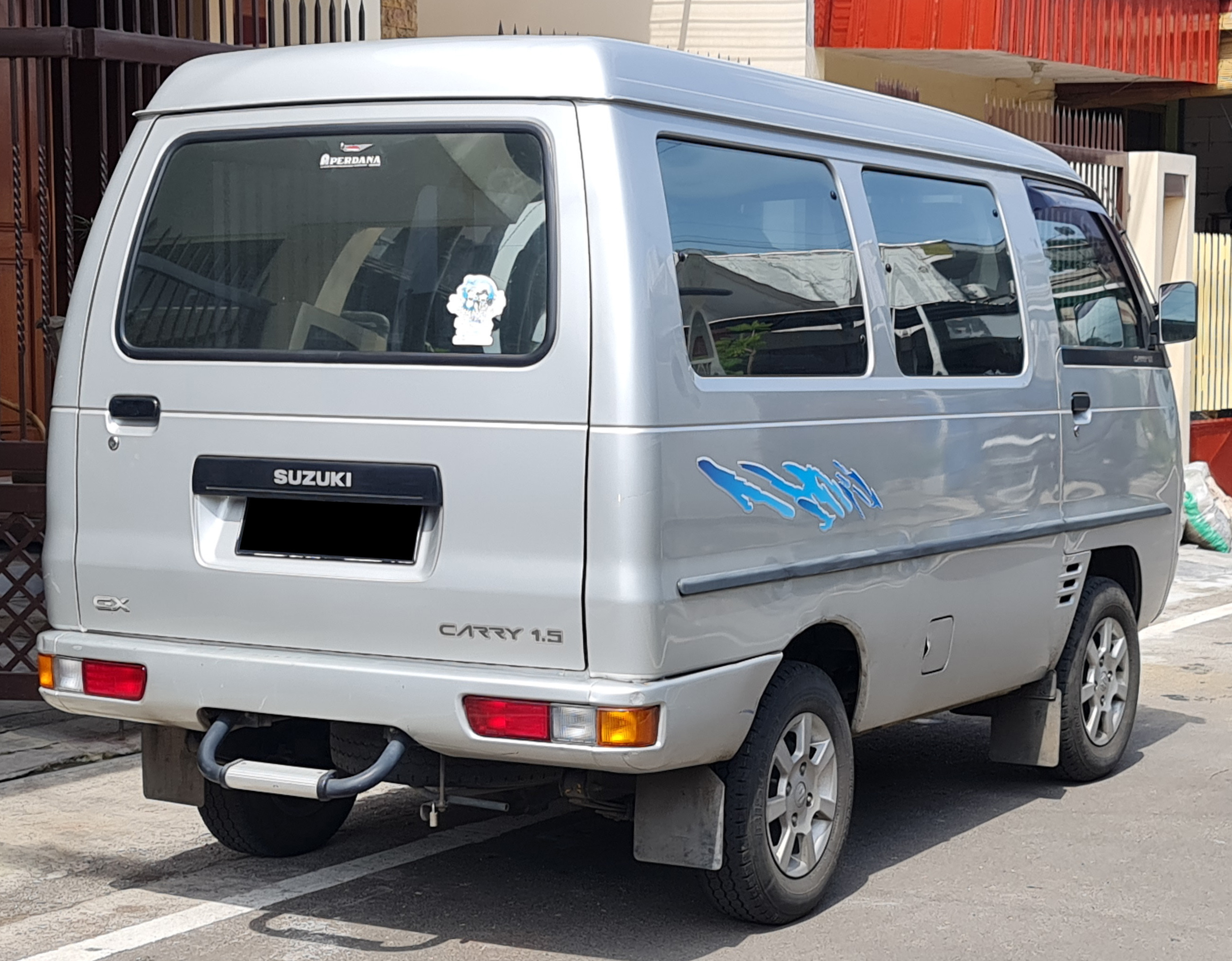
Rear view of the van

==== Mitsubishi Colt T120SS ====
The name of Colt T120SS is a continuation of the first generation Mitsubishi Delica, which was marketed as the "Colt T120" in many countries including Indonesia. When production began in 1991, it replaced the Minicab-based "Jetstar" mini truck. The T120SS is based on the locally developed Futura, with which it shares everything aside from the engines, grille, taillights and slightly bigger bed. Overall length is 3,720 mm (3,940 mm for the "3-way wide deck" version).

Just like the Futura, the Colt T120SS is available as either a bare chassis, a regular pickup truck, or three-way wide deck, with the exception of 4-door van. Initially the truck was powered by Mitsubishi's carburetted 1343 cc 4G17 engine and puts out 78 PS (57 kW; 77 hp) at 6000 rpm. This engine had the same specs from its time of introduction in 1991 until in 1996 when it was redesigned and no longer an interference engine. In March 2005, the engine was replaced by a bigger and fuel injected 1468 cc 4G15 engine, The larger unit, which meets Euro 2 emission standards, produces 86 PS (63 kW) at 5750 rpm. Both engines feature three valves per cylinder or 12-valve in total. The truck was lightly facelifted, with a new grille featuring a triangular central portion. From 1991 to 2019, Mitsubishi Motors built 324,960 units of the T120SS. The last T120SS rolled off the production line at PT Krama Yudha Ratu Motor plant in Pulo Gadung, East Jakarta on 22 January 2019 without replacement like the Futura.

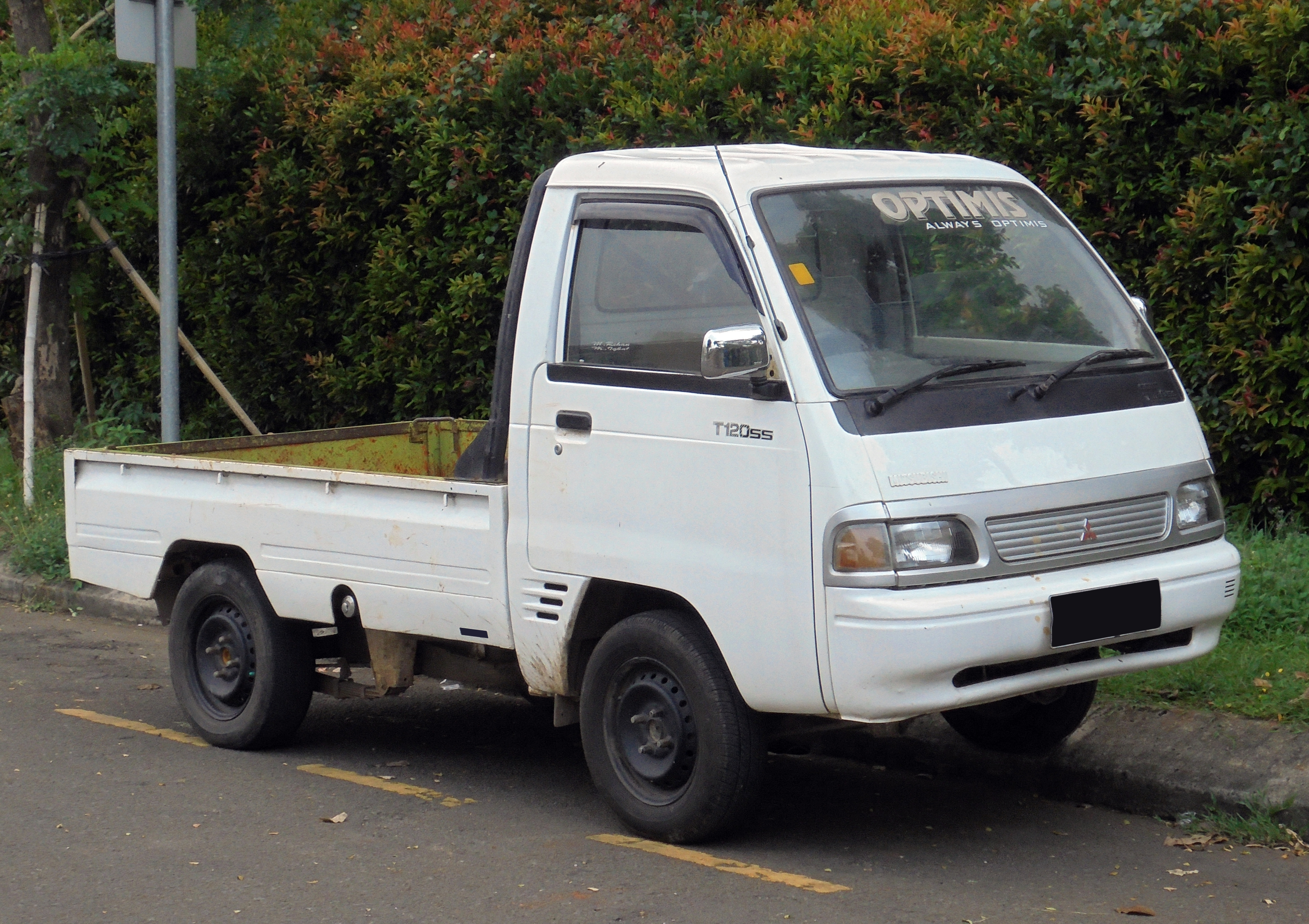
Mitsubishi Colt T120SS (pre-facelift)

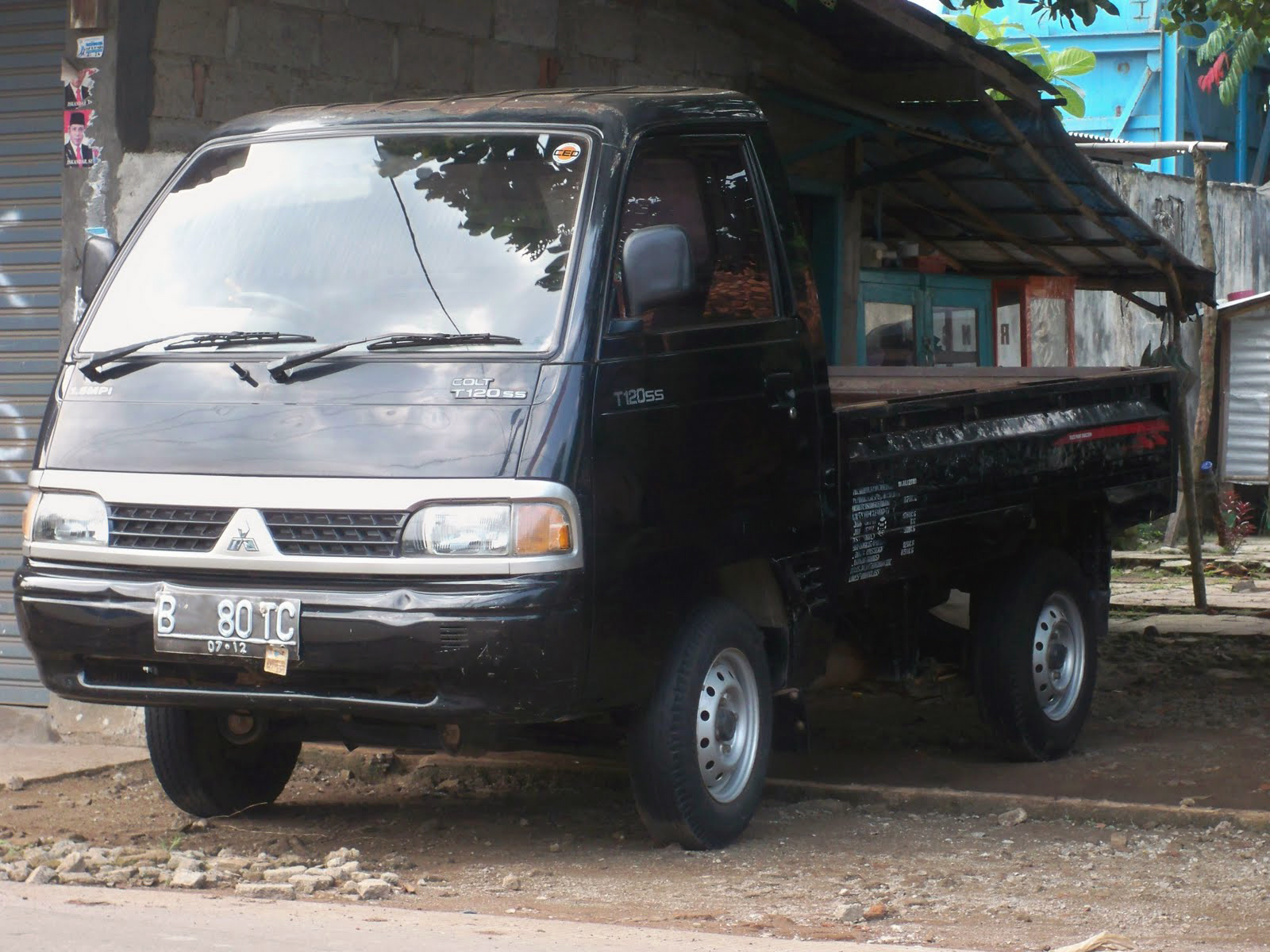
Mitsubishi Colt T120SS (2005 facelift)

==== Maruti Suzuki Super Carry ====
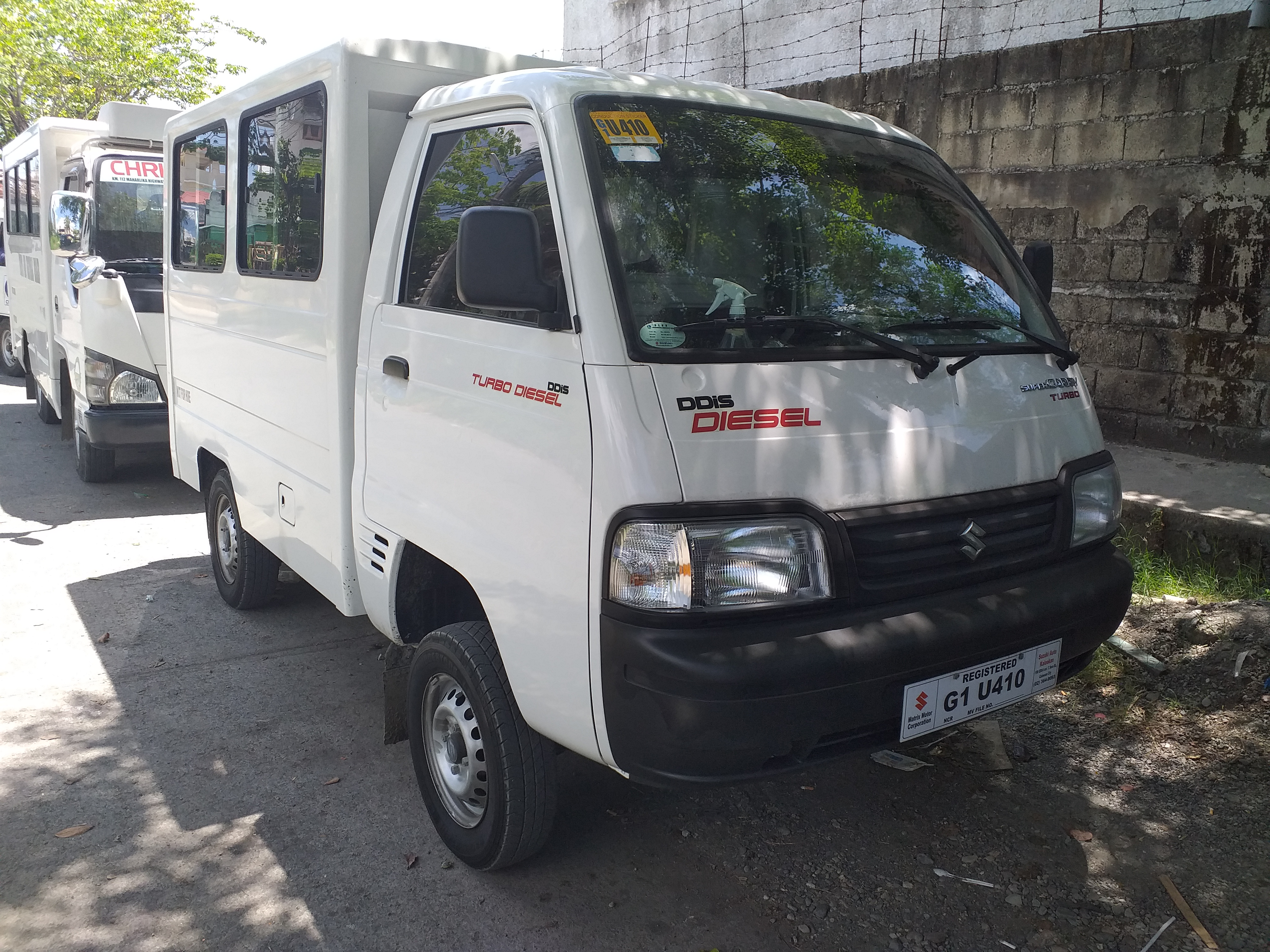
Suzuki Super Carry utility van (Philippines)

Starting in 2016, Maruti Suzuki has launched a small commercial truck called Super Carry in India, based on the Futura. This model receives 140 mm longer wheelbase and different interior than the original model. In India, the truck is powered by either 1196 cc G12B four-cylinder CNG or 793 cc two-cylinder turbodiesel engines and both mated to a 5-speed manual transmission. The latter was first diesel engine developed by Suzuki and also the first for Carry's family. The minuscule engine is not able to power an air-conditioning system. The diesel engine was discontinued in India in March 2020 as the engine is not compliant with the Bharat Stage 6 emissions standard.

The Super Carry was also exported to Africa from April 2016, powered by the 1.2-liter petrol engine. In the Philippines, the truck was introduced in October 2016 and only powered with the same 793 cc diesel engine as for the Indian version. It is available with more variety of bodywork such as flat-bed truck, utility van, cargo van or prepared to be fitted with jeepney bodywork. After the all-new model Carry arrived in the Philippines in 2019, the Super Carry continued to be sold alongside it until it was discontinued few months later.

In April 2023, the 1.2 L petrol/CNG engine was replaced by the more modern dual VVT K12N Dualjet engine.

=== Suzuki Every Plus/Carry 1.3 ===
The Every Plus, was an enlarged seven-seat MPV version of the Every. Introduced in June 1999. The name was changed in May 2001 to Every Landy, accompanied by a facelift introducing a large chromed grille.

=== Suzuki Carry (2019) ===
Suzuki Carry (DC61T/DN61T)
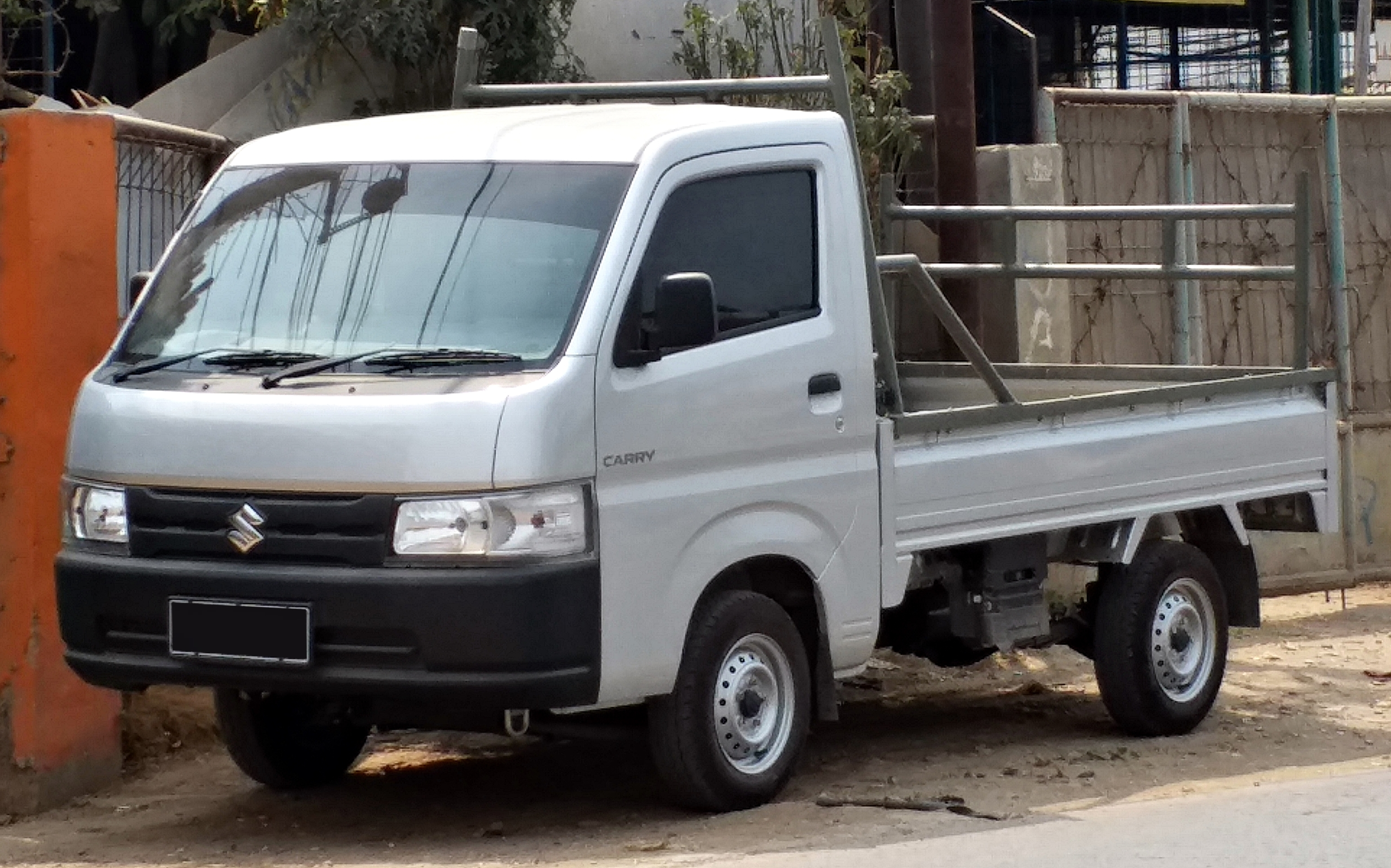
- 2019 Suzuki Carry Flat Deck (DC61T)

Overview
- Also called: Suzuki Super Carry Pro (Vietnam)
- Production: February 2019 – present
- Assembly: Indonesia: Bekasi, West Java (Suzuki Indomobil Motor Tambun Plant)
- Designer: Yoshitake Ishii

Body and chassis
- Body style: 2-door pickup truck 2-door cargo van (Philippines and Indonesia); 4-door utility van (Philippines)
- Layout: Front mid-engine, rear-wheel-drive

Powertrain
- Engine: 1462 cc K15B-C I4 (petrol)
- Transmission: 5-speed manual

Dimensions
- Wheelbase: 2,205 mm (86.8 in)
- Length: 4,195 mm (165.2 in) (pickup truck); 4,237–4,344 mm (166.8–171.0 in) (cargo/utility van)
- Width: 1,675–1,765 mm (65.9–69.5 in)
- Height: 1,870–1,910 mm (73.6–75.2 in) (pickup truck); 2,030–2,167 mm (79.9–85.3 in) (cargo/utility van)
- Curb weight: 1,065–1,100 kg (2,347.9–2,425.1 lb)

Chronology
- Predecessor: Suzuki Carry (SL415); Suzuki Mega Carry/Super Carry Pro (indirect)

Newer version of international Carry has been produced in Indonesia by Suzuki Indomobil Motor since 2019. Replacing the Carry Futura series as well as the Mega Carry, it uses the 1.5 L (1,462 cc) K15B-C engine, producing 71 kW (97 PS). It was launched at the 27th Indonesia International Motor Show on 25 April 2019 and is exported to nearly 100 countries. It was also launched in Thailand on 16 August 2019 and in the Philippines on 26 September 2019.

The top-trim version was unveiled called Luxury on 5 March 2021 at the 2020 Gaikindo Indonesia International Commercial Vehicle Expo. Features body coloured, chrome grille, and chrome wheel cover. A blind van version was added in later 2020.

The Carry received a minor facelift on 21 January 2021 and only available for Indonesian market. Feature a redesigned front bumper.

The Carry was launched in the Middle East in February 2024.

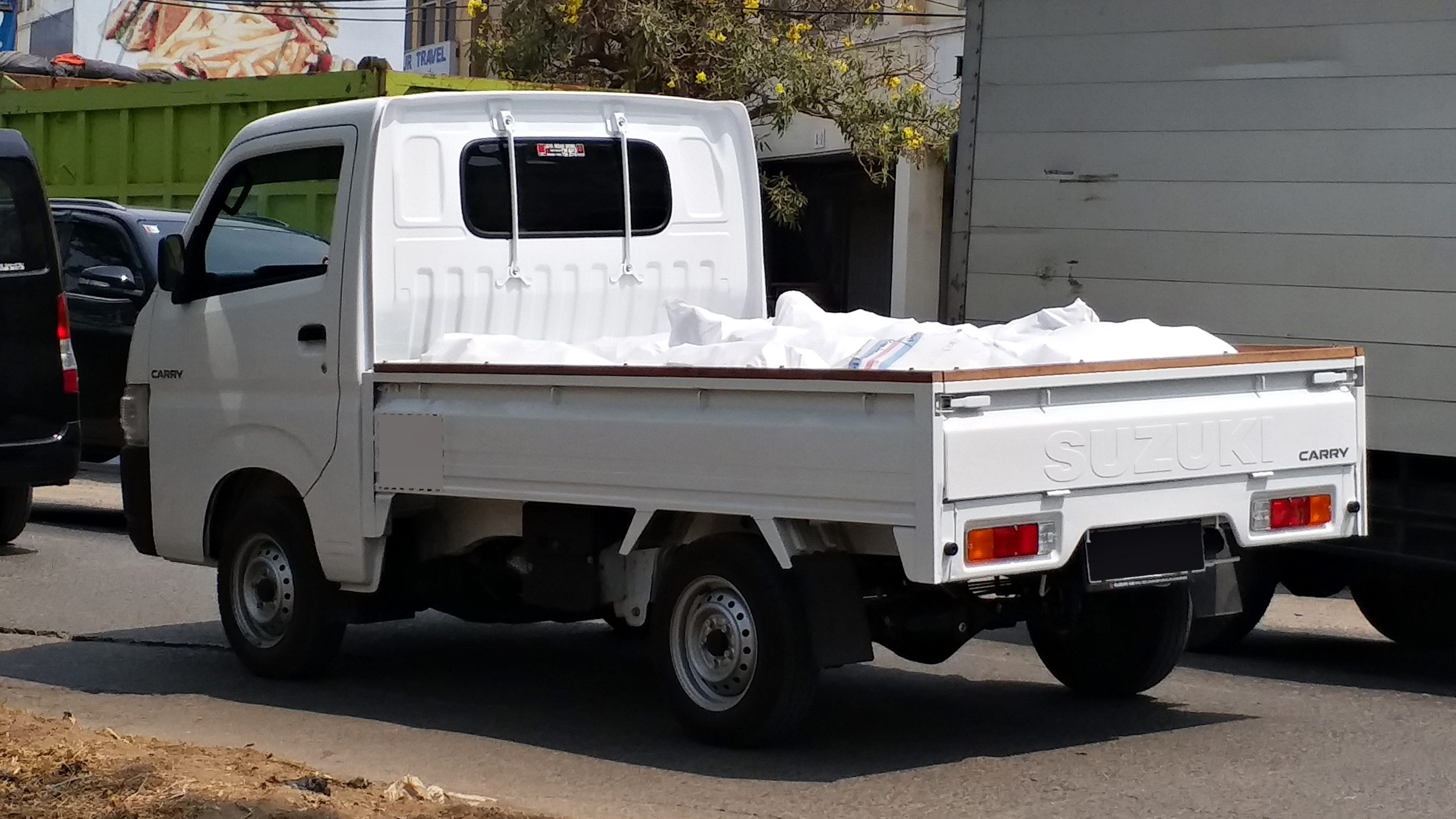
2019 Suzuki Carry Flat Deck (Indonesia)

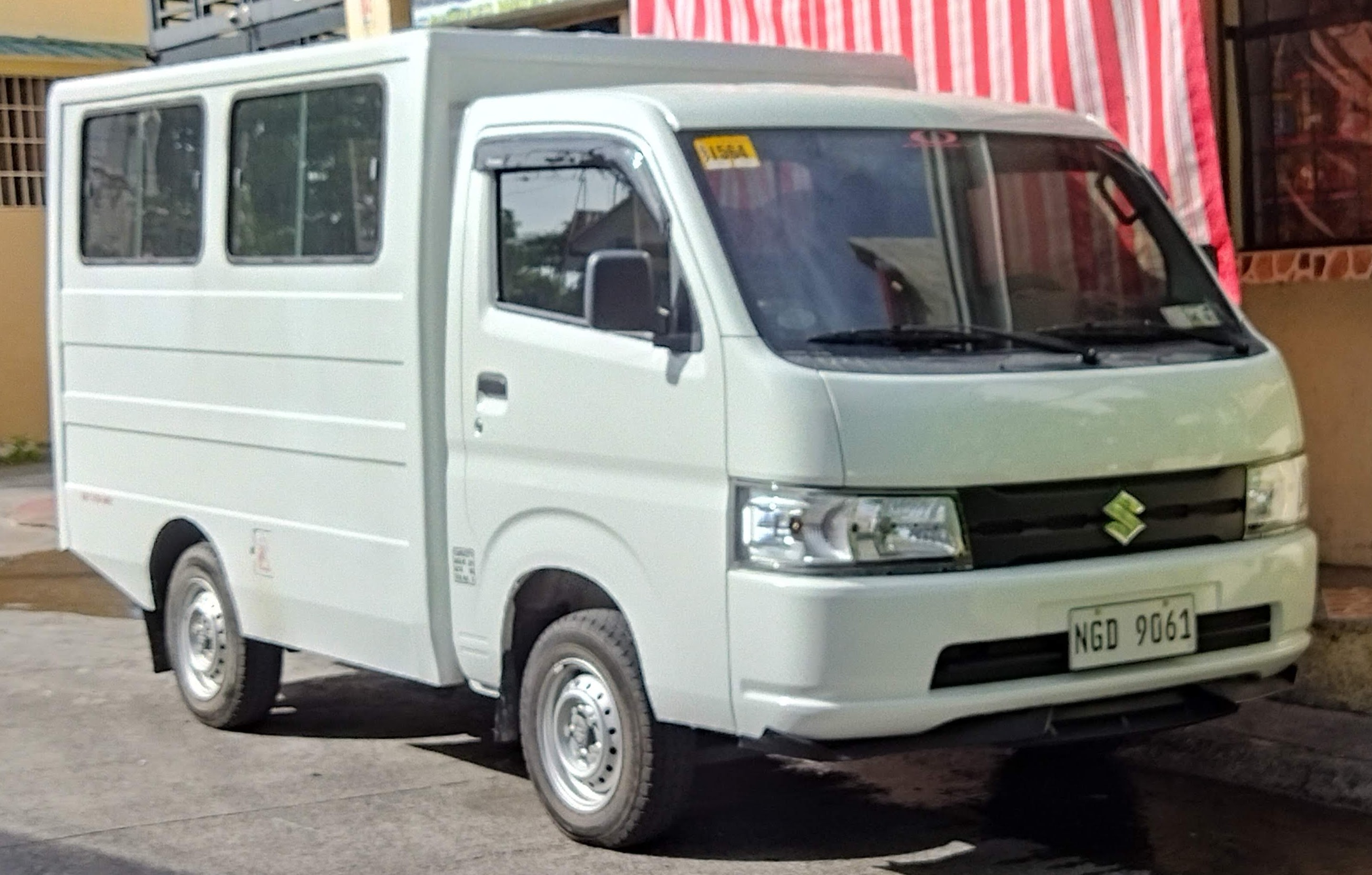
2021 Suzuki Carry Utility Van (pre-facelift, Philippines)

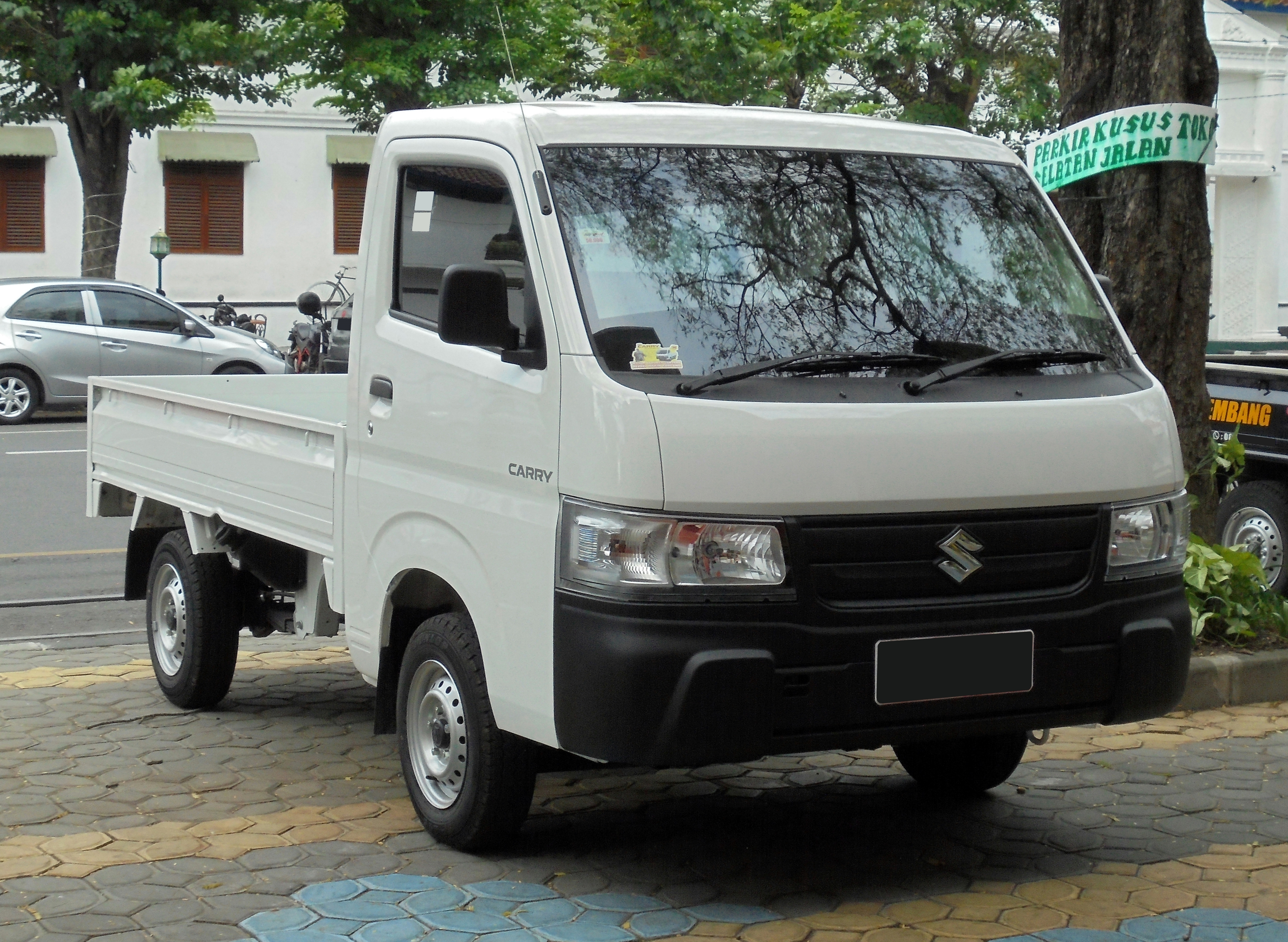
2021 Suzuki Carry Flat Deck (facelift, Indonesia)

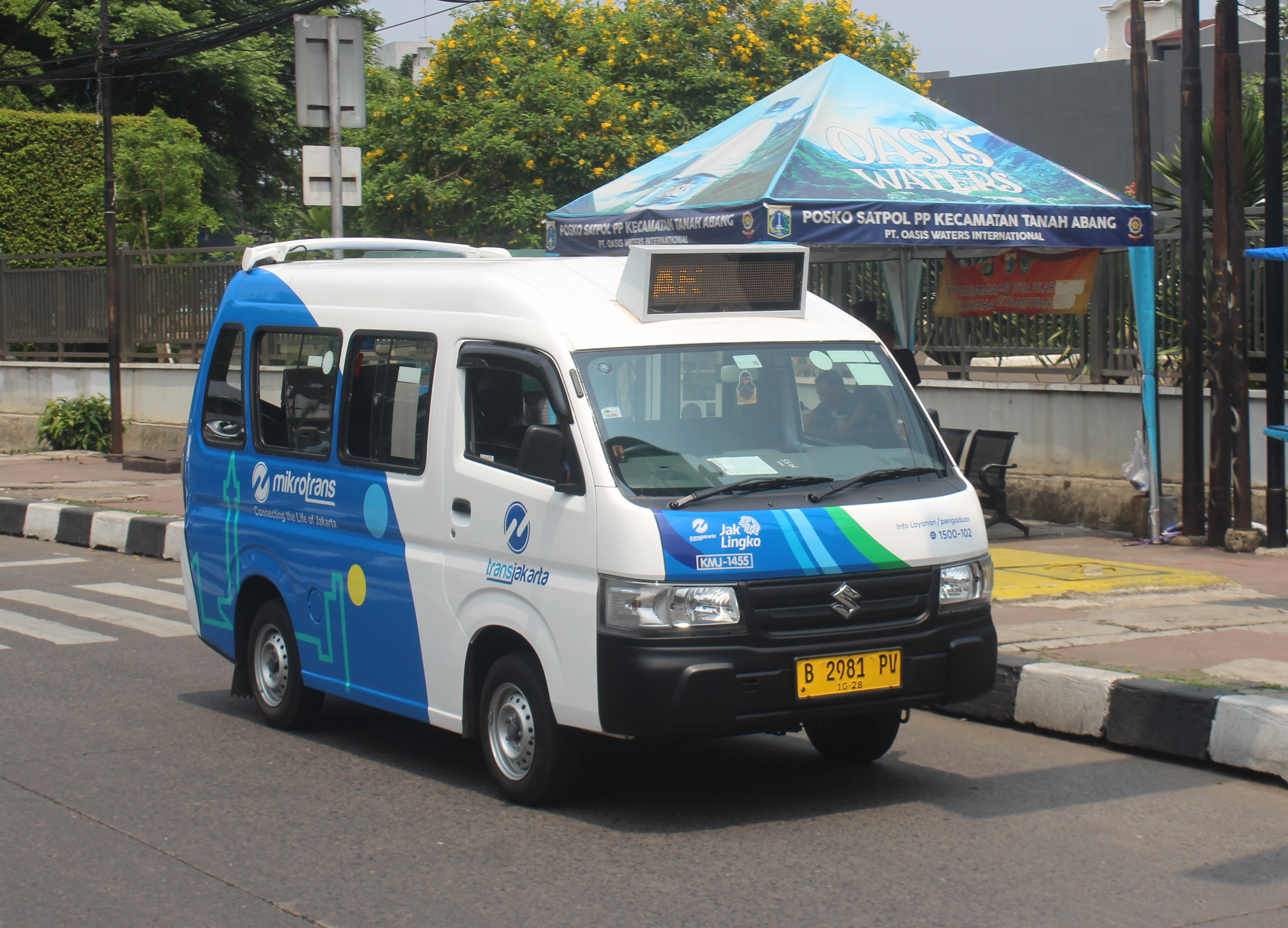
2021 Suzuki Carry minibus used as share taxis under the Jak Lingko program (facelift, Indonesia)

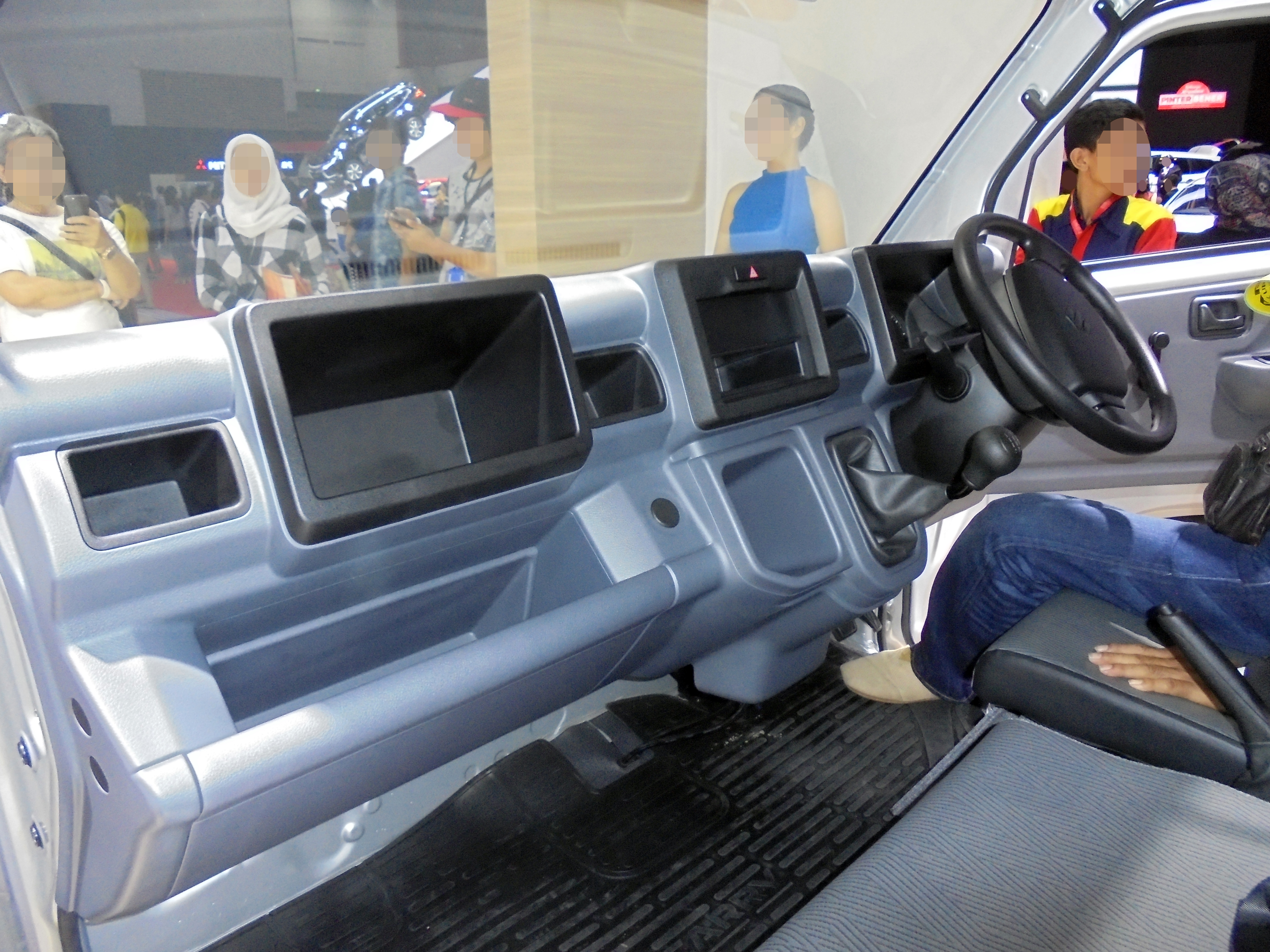
Interior

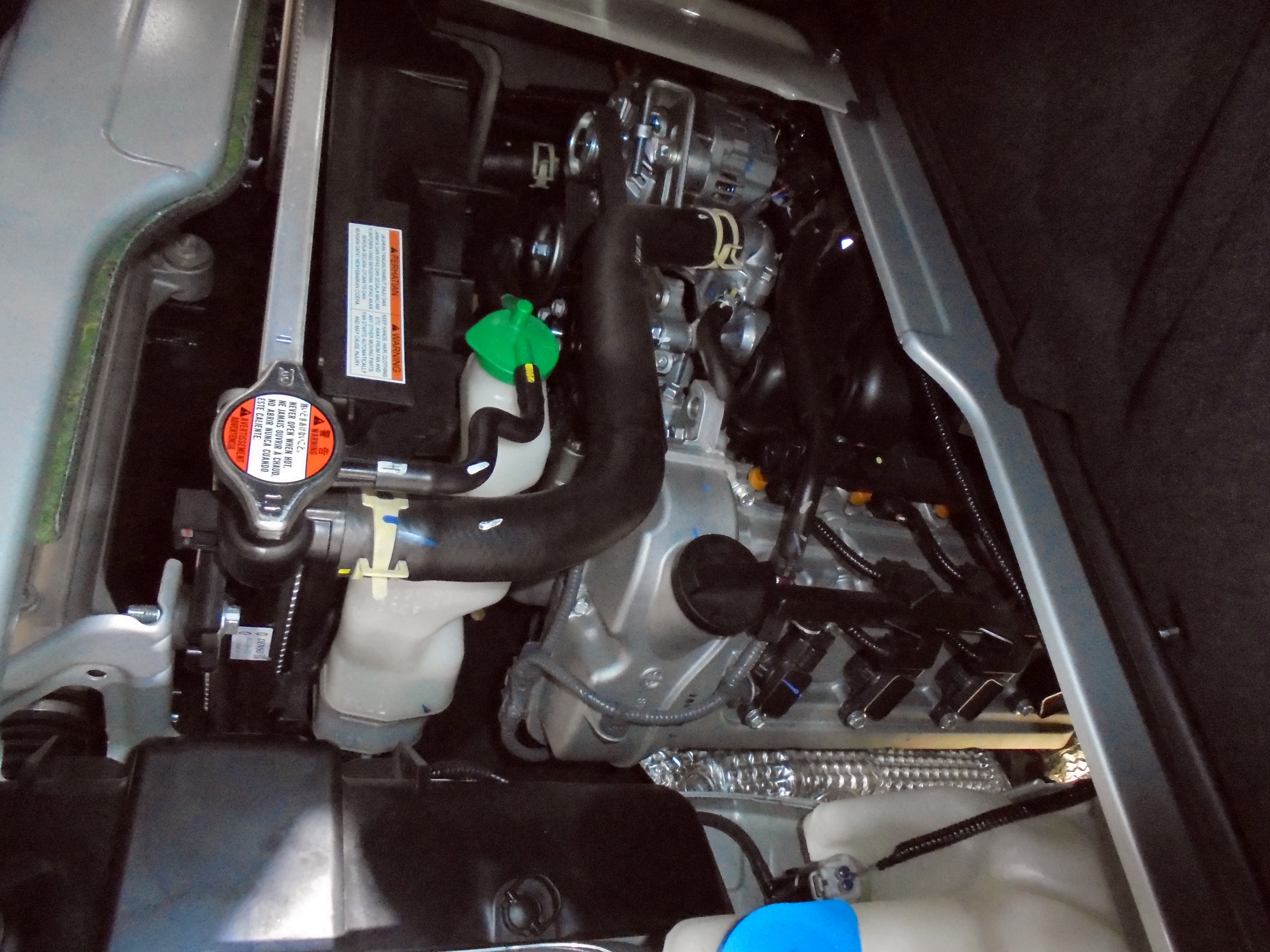
K15B-C engine

== Nameplate use with other vehicles ==
=== Suzuki Mega Carry ===
The pickup truck version of the Suzuki APV was sold as the Suzuki Carry in export markets, Suzuki Mega Carry in Indonesia and Pakistan, and also as Super Carry Pro in Vietnam. It was sold in export markets from 2005, in Indonesia from 2011, and was discontinued in February 2019.

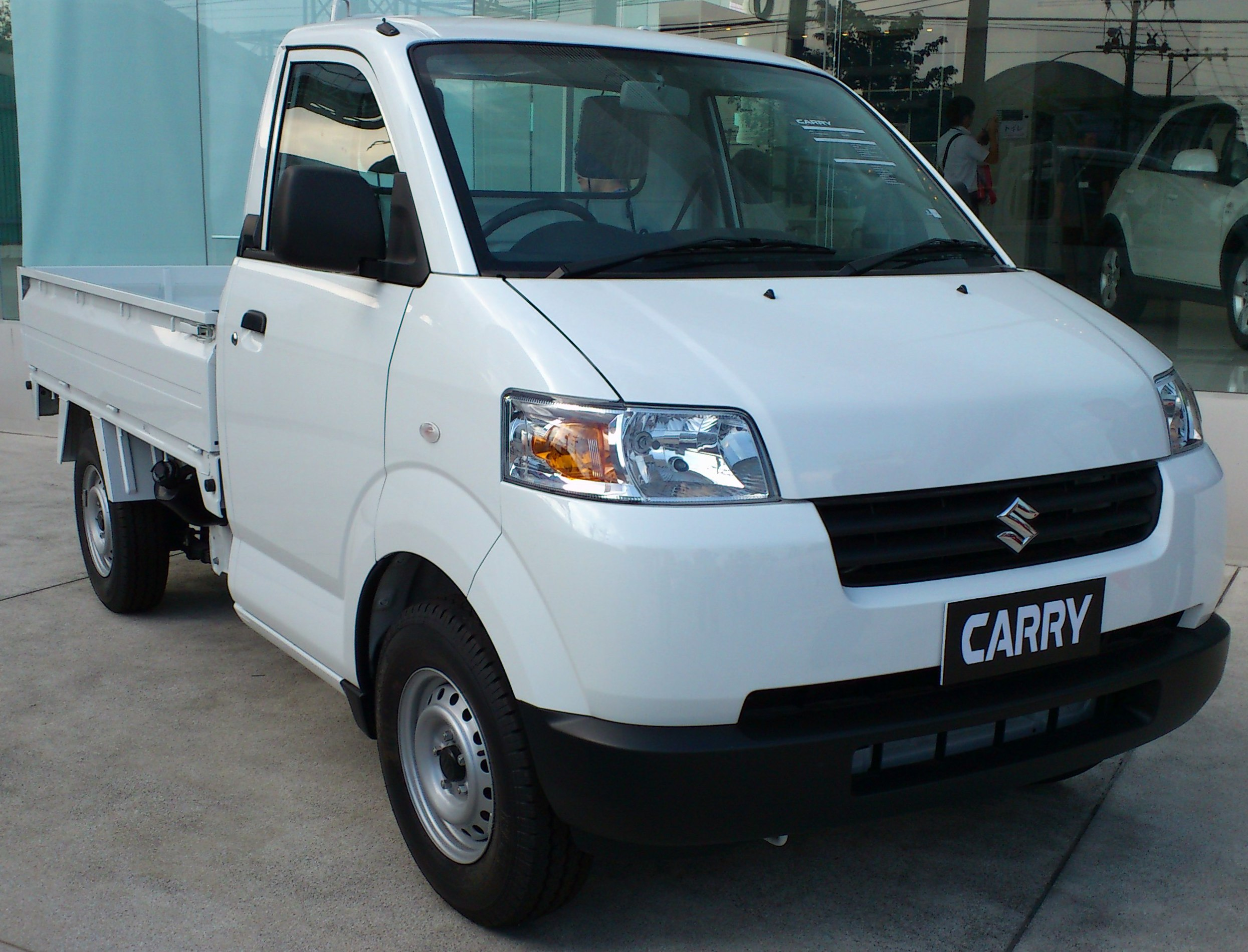
Suzuki Carry (Thailand)
