= Malang =

City in East Java, Indonesia

Malang Tumapel
- City
- City of Malang; Kota Malang

Local transcription(s)
  - Javanese: Kuthå Malang (Gêdrig) كوڟا مالاڠ (Pégon) ꦏꦸꦛꦩꦭꦁ (Hånåcåråkå)
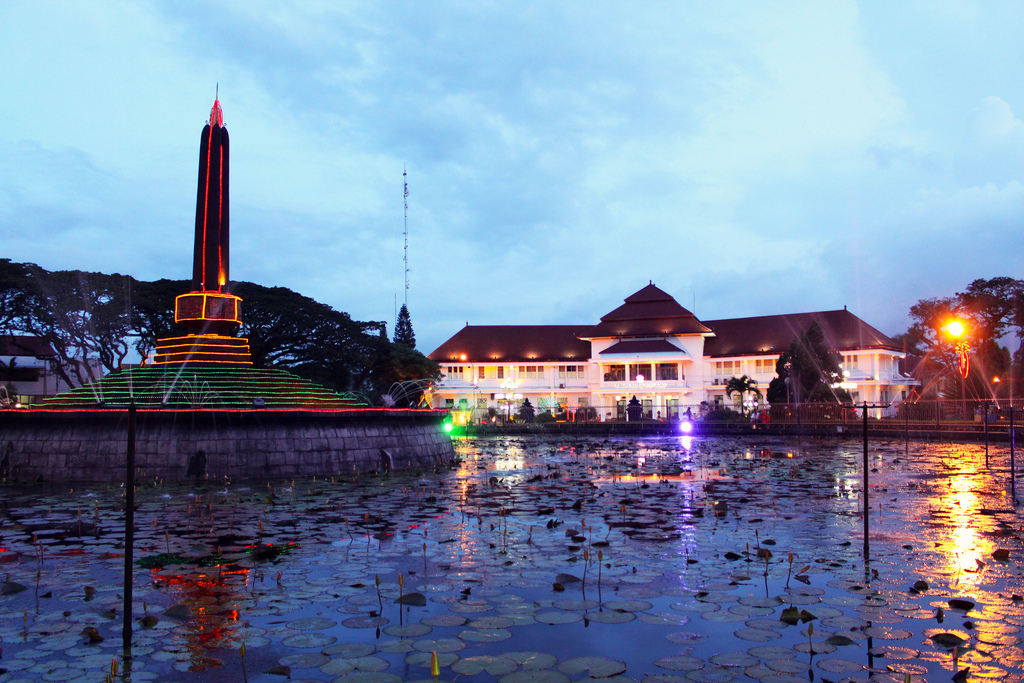
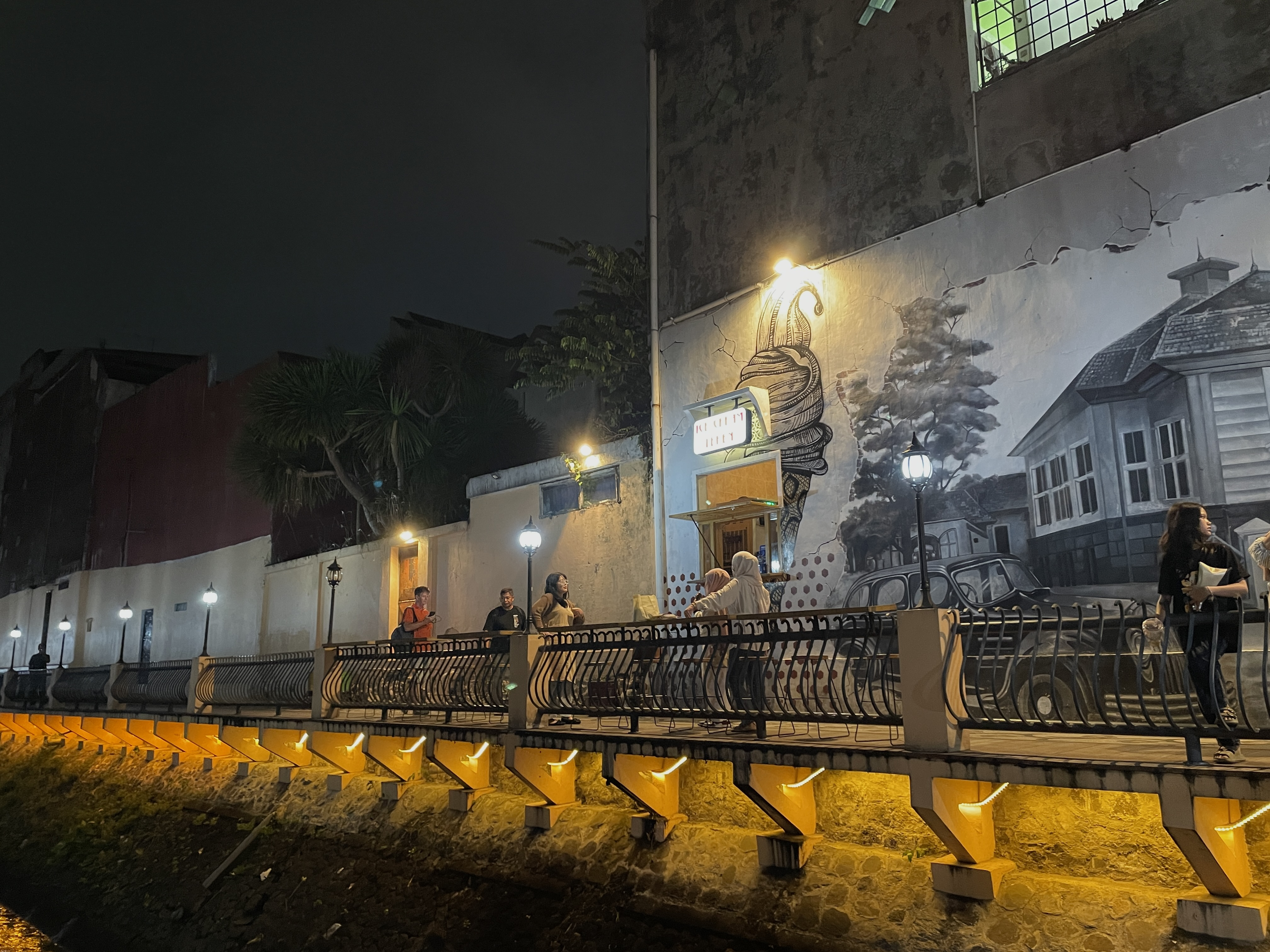
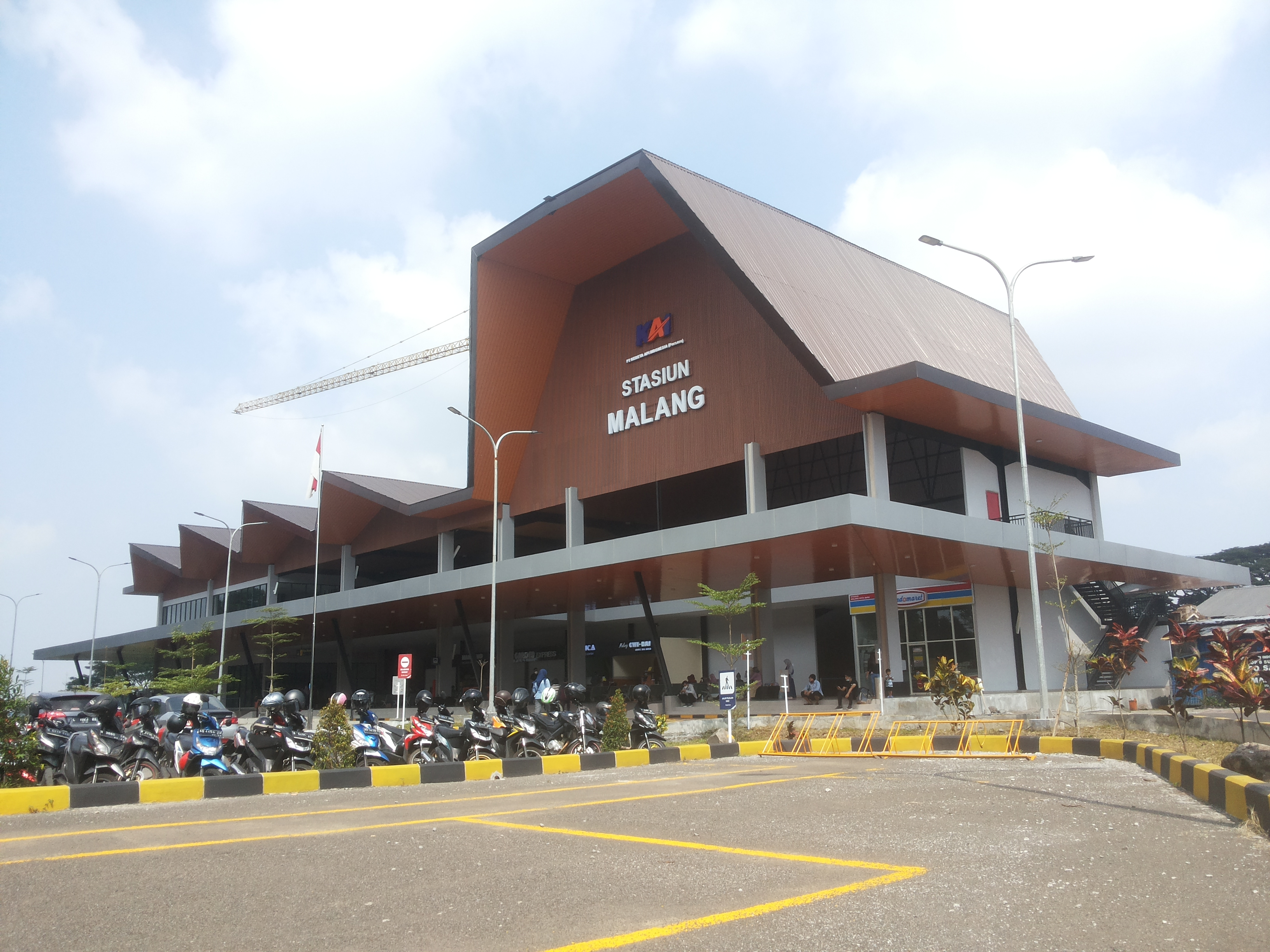
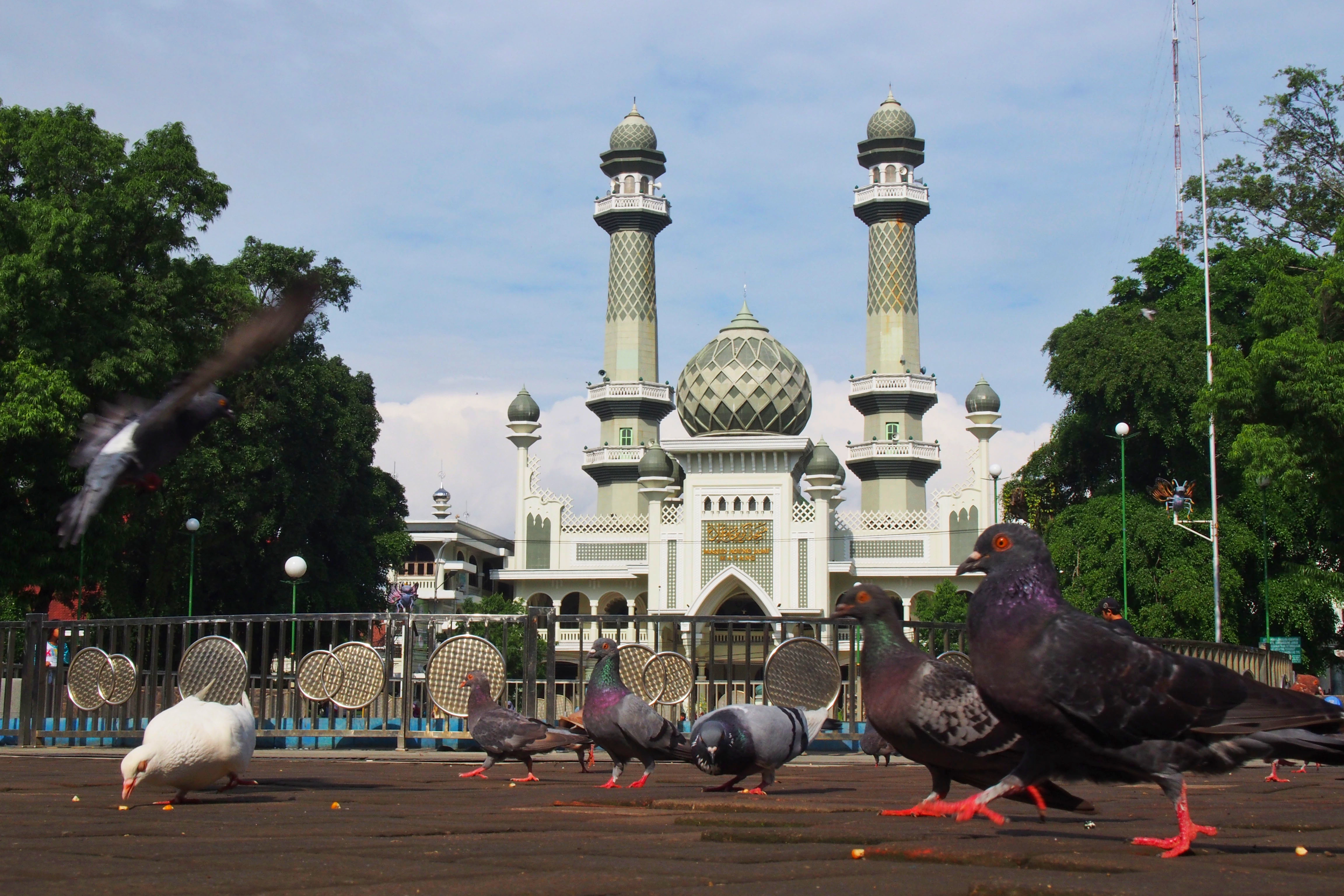
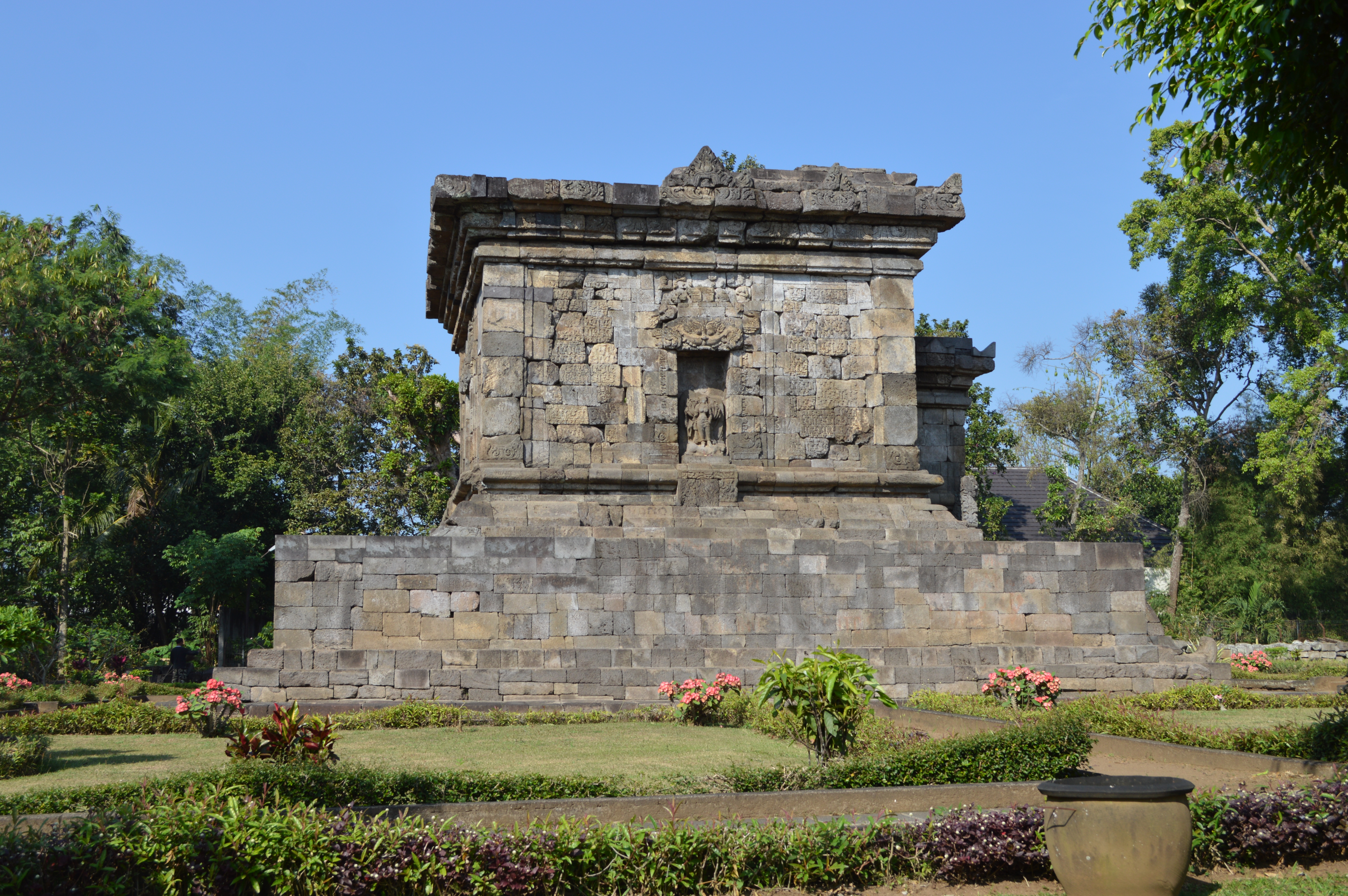
- Malang City Hall and Tugu Monument Kayutangan Heritage Village Malang Station Great Mosque of Malang Badut Temple

- Coat of arms
- Nicknames: Kota Bunga "Flower City"
- Motto: Malang Kuçeçwara (Old Javanese) "God shattering the wrong, uphold the correct"
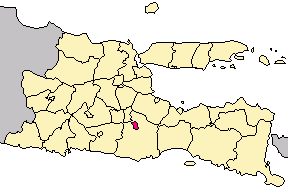
- Location within East Java

- Location in Java and Indonesia Malang (Indonesia) Malang (Asia)
- Coordinates: 7°58′48″S 112°37′12″E
- Country: Indonesia
- Province: East Java
- Founded: 760 AD
- Incorporated (as gemeente): 1 April 1914

Government
  - Type: Mayor-council
  - Body: Malang City Government
  - Mayor: Wahyu Hidayat (Gerindra)
  - Vice Mayor: Ali Muthohirin
  - Legislature: Malang City Regional House of Representatives (DPRD)

Area
  - City: 111.077 km^{2} (42.887 sq mi)
  - Urban: 1,132.7 km^{2} (437.3 sq mi)
  - Metro: 2,332.29 km^{2} (900.50 sq mi)
- Elevation: 506 m (1,660 ft)

Population (mid 2025 estimate)
  - City: 891,859
  - Density: 8,029.20/km^{2} (20,795.5/sq mi)
  - Metro: 3,061,970
  - Metro density: 1,312.86/km^{2} (3,400.29/sq mi)
- Demonym(s): Malangan, Arema
- Time zone: UTC+7 (WIB)
- Postal Code: 6511x–6514x
- Area code: (+62) 341
- Vehicle registration: N
- HDI (2024): ▲0.840 (11th) very high
- Website: malangkota.go.id

Malang (/mɒˈlɒŋ/; Javanese: ꦏꦸꦛꦩꦭꦁ, romanized: Kutha Malang, Indonesian: Kota Malang), historically known as Tumapel, is a landlocked city in East Java, Indonesia. It has a history dating back to the age of the Singhasari Kingdom. It is the second most populous city in the province, with a population of 820,043 at the 2010 Census and 843,810 at the 2020 Census; the official estimate as of mid 2025 was 891,859 (comprising 443,302 males and 448,557 females). The Malang Metropolitan area (Greater Malang) was home to 3,096,425 inhabitants in 2025, spread across two cities (Malang itself and Batu) and 22 other districts (21 in Malang Regency and one in Pasuruan Regency). Malang is the third largest city by economy in East Java, after Surabaya and Kediri, with an estimated 2016 GDP at Rp. 44.30 trillion.

The city is well known for its mild climate. During Dutch colonization, it was a popular destination for European residents. Even now, Malang still holds its position as a popular destination for international tourists. Malang keeps various historical relics. This city keeps relics of the Kingdom of Kanjuruhan period until the Dutch period. The existence of Dutch heritage in general is in the form of ancient buildings such as the Kayutangan church and Ijen Cathedral which employ Gothic architecture. Malang also holds various events to preserve its cultural heritage, one of which is Malang Tempo Doeloe Festival. There is also a lot of historical heritage which has become a landmark like Tugu Malang (Alun-alun Bundar). Additionally, Malang is well-known because of its label as an educational city. Two of the best universities in Indonesia are in Malang, namely Brawijaya University and Malang State University.

Malang has various ethnic groups and cultures from all over Indonesia and the world. The population of Malang comprised 889,359 people in mid-2024, with a majority of Javanese, followed by the Madurese, and Chinese or Peranakan. Malang extended urban area, notable known as Malang Raya, is the second largest in East Java after Gerbangkertosusila (Surabaya Metropolitan Area). From the perspective of Javanese culture, the majority of Malang people belong to Arekan Javanese culture.

Malang was spared many of the effects of the Asian financial crisis, and since that time, it has been marked by steady economic and population growth.

== Etymology ==
The etymology of the name Malang is uncertain. One of the theories said that the name Malang is derived from the words Malangkuçeçwara, which means "God has destroyed the false and enforced the right". The words were taken from an ancient term which mentions a legendary temple called Malangkuçeçwara, supposedly located near the city Malang. The word Malangkuçeçwara was applied as the motto of the city of Malang. The name "Malang" first appeared on the Pamotoh / Ukirnegara Inscription (1120 Saka / 1198 AD) which was discovered on 11 January 1975 by a Bantaran plantation administrator in Wlingi, Blitar Regency. In the copper inscription, one part is written (with the following translation) as follows.

...taning sakrid Malang-akalihan
wacid lawan macu pasabhanira
dyah Limpa Makanagran I...

Translation:

... in the east where hunting around Malang
with wacid and the mancu,
Dyah Limpa rice fields namely ...

Malang here refers to an eastern of Mount Kawi. Although it is known that the use of the name Malang has been going on at least since the 12th century, the etymology of its name cannot be ascertained.

The first hypothesis refers to the name of a holy building called Malangkuçeçwara (pronounced [malaŋkuʃeʃworo]). The sacred building is referred to in two Balitung King inscriptions from Ancient Mataram, namely the Mantyasih Inscription in 907 AD and the Inscription of 908 AD. Experts still have not obtained an agreement on where the building is located. On the one hand, there are a number of experts who say that the Malangkuçeçwara building is located in the Mount Buring area, a mountain that stretches east of Malang, where one of its peaks named "Malang". Others, on the other hand, suspect that the actual location of the sacred building is in the Tumpang area, Malang Regency. In the area, there is a village called Malangsuka, which, according to historians, comes from the word Malangkuça (pronounced [malankuʃoː]) which is pronounced upside down. This opinion is reinforced by the existence of ancient relics around Tumpang, such as Jago Temple and Kidal Temple, which are in the territory of the Kingdom of Singhasari.

The Malangkuçeçwara name consists of 3 words, namely mala, which means falsehood, cheating, falsehood, and evil, angkuça (pronounced [aŋkuʃo] which means to destroy or destroy, and içwara (pronounced [iʃworo]) which means God. Therefore, Malangkuçeçwara means "God has destroyed the vanity".

The second hypothesis refers to the story of the assault of the Mataram Sultanate forces in Malang in 1614, led by Tumenggung Alap-Alap. According to folklore, there was a conversation between Tumenggung Alap-Alap and one of his assistants regarding the condition of Malang before the attack began. The assistant from Tumenggung Alap-Alap mentioned residents and soldiers from the area as residents who "blocked the halangi" ("Malang" in Javanese) from the arrival of Mataram troops. After the conquest, the Mataram forces named the area of the conquest as Malang.

== History ==
=== Early history ===
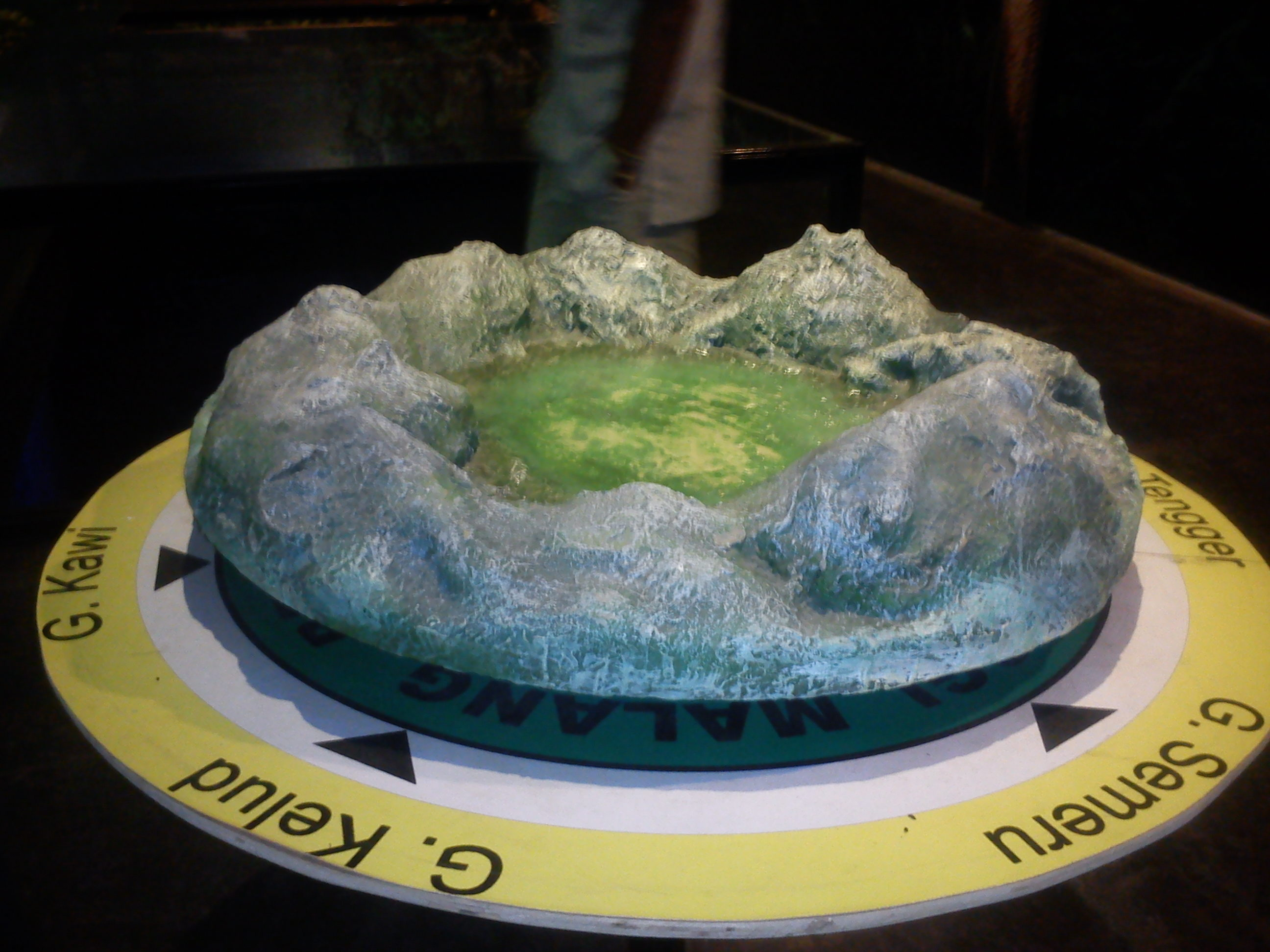
Miniature of Malang Highlands

The Malang area in the Pleistocene era was still a deep basin flanked by volcanic activity from mountains such as the Karst Mountains in the south, Kawi, Butak, and Kelud in the west, Anjasmoro and Arjuno-Welirang complex in the northeast and north, and the Tengger Mountains Complex in the east. The basin has not been inhabited by humans because the condition is still in the form of lava and hot lava flows from the surrounding mountains. Towards the rainy season, the Malang basin is filled with water flowing through the mountain slopes, leading to a number of rivers and forming an ancient swamp. The swamps spread to create ancient lakes.

When the ancient lake had not dried up, early human civilization was still in the early to advanced stages of Hunting and Collecting Food. The settlements are still on the slopes of mountains and mountains that surround Malang in the form of natural caves. Therefore, it is understandable that the discovery of artifacts in the Paleolithic and Mesolithic period is found in mountainous areas, such as on the slopes of Mount Kawi, Arjuno-Welirang, Tengger, Semeru and the Southern Karst Mountains.

Malang ancient lake gradually dried up in the Holocene era and caused the Malang region to become a plateau in Malang. When it began to enter the Planting Period, early humans began to descend from the mountains and make a number of settlements and agricultural areas. The discovery of a number of artifacts in the form of two square pickaxes, chalcedony stone tools and hand-held andesite axes on the east side of Mount Kawi in the Kacuk area around the Metro and Brantas streams reinforced this assumption. [8] In addition, the study estimates that the forms of occupancy in the transitional period were in the form of a stilt house, where the body of the house was supported by the legs of the house and was several meters above the ground. This is reinforced by the discovery of artifacts in the form of "Watu Gong" or "Watu Kenong" in Dinoyo, Lowokwaru, Malang, whose forms are similar to traditional musical instruments, namely gong, which are actually swear or foundation of a stilt house. The growth of settlements around the river flowing in Malang became the forerunner of the ancient civilizations of the Homo sapiens.

=== Hindu and Islamic Kingdoms ===
==== Kanjuruhan Kingdom ====
The history of Malang Regency could be revealed through the Dinoyo inscription at year of 760 as the primary official document to support the birth of Malang before a new inscription was discovered in 1986, which is yet to be deciphered. According to the inscription, it was concluded that the 8th century was the beginning of the existence of Malang Regency's government due to the birth of King Gajayana's ruling of his Indianized Hindu kingdom in Malang. From the Dinoyo inscription, it is noted that the inscription used the "Candra Sengkala" or Cronogram Calendar, and stated that the birth date of Malang Regency was on Jum'at Legi (sweet Friday) of 28 November 760.

==== Mataram Kingdom ====
Kanjuruhan Kingdom power is estimated to not last long. The kingdom was finally under the rule of Mataram (Ancient Mataram Kingdom) during the leadership of King Dyah Balitung (899–911 AD). In the Balingawan Inscription (813 Saka / 891 AD), it is mentioned Pu Huntu as Rakryan Kanuruhan (ruler of Kanuruhan character) in the reign of King Mpu Daksa (911–919 AD). The area that used to be an autonomous kingdom has dropped one level to a watak (region) that is on a level with the duchy or district (one level under the authority of the king). Watak Kanuruhan which covers the center of Malang today is an entity that stands side by side with Watak Hujung (in Ngujung, Toyomarto Village, District Singosari, Malang Regency) and Watak Tugaran (in Tegaron, Lesanpuro, Kedungkandang, Malang Regency) which each oversees several wanua (village level).

When the capital Mataram was moved to the Tamwlang and Watugaluh (Jombang) areas during the reign of King Mpu Sindok (929–948 AD), several inscriptions such as Sangguran, Turyyan, Gulung-Gulung, Linggasutan, Jeru-Jeru, Tija, Kanuruhan, Muncang, and Wurandungan describes a number of tax liability policies for sima (civil villages) in Malang and a number of land grant processes to build temples.

==== Kahuripan, Janggala, and Kediri Kingdoms ====
Division of the Kediri Kingdom (dark orange) and Jenggala Kingdom (bright orange) before 1135. The boundaries of the two regions meet at Mount Kawi.

There is no record that explains in detail the status and role of the area around Malang during King Airlangga's leadership in addition to the fact that Malang entered the territory of the Kingdom of Kahuripan. Because the Malang area is no longer the center of government of the Kingdom which is centered around Mount Penanggungan and Sidoarjo with its capital Kahuripan. Even when Raja Airlangga divided Kahuripan into Panjalu which was centered in Daha (Kadiri) and Jenggala which remained centered in Kahuripan, the Malang region was included as a peripheral of the powers of both kingdoms. However, it can be ascertained that the Malang region entered the Jenggala region at the time of this division. The division of Kahuripan shows that Mount Kawi was used as the boundary of the two new kingdoms with the eastern side obtained by Jenggala.

Malang again became an important area in the history of Panjalu or Jenggala when King Jayabhaya of Panjalu conquered Jenggala. In the Hantang Inscription (1057 Saka / 1135 AD), it is written Panjalu Jayati ("Panjalu Menang"), signifying Panjalu's victory over Jenggala. The inscription also included the granting of special privileges to several villages in Hantang (Ngantang, Malang Regency) and its surroundings for their services in favor of Panjalu during the war. This inscription also shows that the Malang region was under the authority of Panjalu.

The Kamulan Inscription (1116 Saka / 1194 AD) records the events of the attack of an area from the east of Daha (Kadiri) against King Kertajaya (in the Pararaton called Dandang Gendhis) who resided in the Katang-Katang Kedaton. There is no further research on whether the attack was a rebellion or attempted conquest. However, the existence of the Kamulan Inscription shows that there was a new political force that emerged to oppose Panjalu's power. This argument is reinforced by the existence of the Sukun Inscription (1083 Saka / 1161 AD) which mentions a king named Jayamerta who gave special rights to Sukun Village (allegedly in Sukun District of Malang) for fighting enemies. Jayamerta has never been stated explicitly or implicitly in various records that refer to information regarding both the list of rulers of Kadiri and Jenggala. Some historians such as Agus Sunyoto mention that the area of origin of the resistance was named Purwa or Purwwa. This was supported by Sunyoto's argument when referring to all Majapahit rulers as descendants of Ken Arok who "[...] drained his seed into the world through teja which emanated from" secrets "Ken Dedes, naraiswari [...] Purwa Kingdom." "Naraiswari (or nareswari / Ardanareswari) himself in Sanskrit means "the main woman" and Ken Dedes himself is the daughter of Mpu Purwa, a brahmana from Panawijyan (Kelurahan Polowijen, Kecamatan Blimbing, Malang). In the end the resistance effort from the area which was said to be named Purwa / Purwwa was successfully crushed by Panjalu.

Some historians attribute the series of events of resistance and crackdown to the socio-political context of the two conflicts involving King Kertajaya and the Brahmin class. The first is the policy of King Kertajaya who tried to reduce a number of rights from the Brahmana class. Some folklore shows that King Kertajaya wanted to be "worshiped" by the Brahmins so that it was contrary to the religious teachings of the Brahmins. The second is the kidnapping of Ken Dedes by Tunggul Ametung, akuwu (equivalent to sub-district head) for the Tumapel region. According to Blasius Suprapto, the location of Tumapel itself was in an area formerly called Kutobedah (now called Kotalama, Kedungkandang, Malang). The implication of the two conflicts was the withdrawal of political support from the Brahmana class against Raja Kertajaya.

==== Singhasari Empire ====
The collapse of Panjalu / Kadiri and the birth of the Tumapel Kingdom in Malang originated from the Brahmana class from Panjalu who tried to save himself from political persecution by King Kertajaya. They fled eastward and joined the political forces in Tumapel, led by Ken Angrok or Ken Arok. He then rebelled against Akuwu Tunggul Ametung and took control of Tumapel. Ken Arok's victory was at the same time a statement of war to separate himself from Panjalu/Kadiri. The power struggle between Kertajaya and Ken Arok towards the Malang region and its surroundings led to the Battle of Ganter in Ngantang (now a sub-district in Malang Regency) (1144 Saka / 1222 AD) which was won by Ken Arok. He also ordained himself as the first king of the Kingdom of Tumapel with the title Rajasa Sang Amurwabhumi. The capital itself remained in Tumapel but changed its name to Kutaraja.

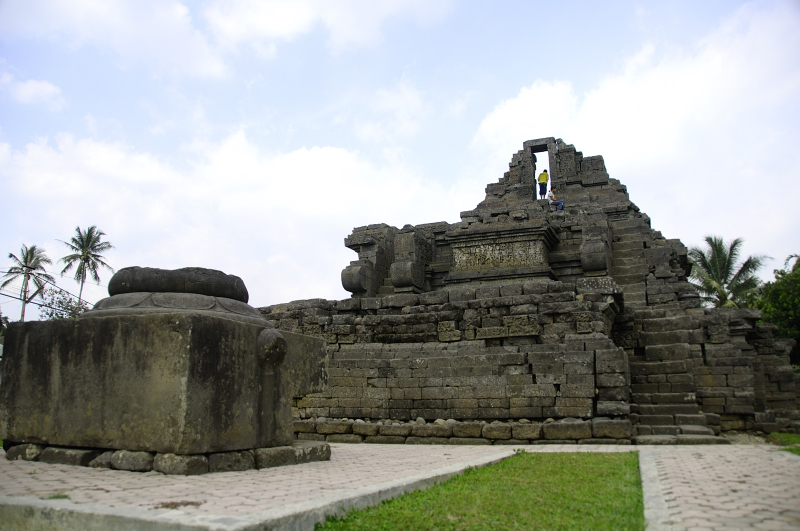
Jago Temple, a place of worship for King Wisnuwardhana, in Tumpang, Malang Regency

During the period of the transfer of the royal capital during the reign of King Wisnuwardhana from Kutaraja to Singhasari (Singosari District, Malang Regency) in 1176 Saka / 1254 AD, there was no comprehensive record of the strategic status of the Malang region in the Tumapel era. There was no explanation for the reasons for the move but starting in this era Singhasari became the name of this kingdom. The remaining data only shows a number of historical places in Malang such as the Gunung Katu area in Genengan (Prangargo, Wagir, Malang Regency) which according to historian Dwi Cahyono is a dharma site, Kidjo Rejo area (Kidal Village, District Tumpang, Malang Regency), where Raja Anusapati was worshiped in Candi Kidal, and the Tumpang area where Raja Wisnuwardhana was dharma in Jago Temple. Another legacy is the spring of Watugede in Watugede Village, Singosari District, Malang Regency. According to Agus Irianto, the bathing staff of Watugede, Pararaton wrote that this place was often used by Ken Dedes and other prospective women to clean the body. The village elders also believe that in this place Ken Arok also saw the light emanating from the body of Ken Dedes as a sign that he was a nareswari.

During the leadership of Raja Kertanegara, the Kingdom of Singhasari faced a rebellion by Jayakatwang from the bracelet area (around Madiun). Jayakatwang himself is the great-grandson of Raja Kertajaya according to Negarakertagama and nephew of Raja Wisnuwardhana (from the lineage of women) according to the Mula Malurung Inscription. The rebellion killed Raja Kertanegara, the last king of Singhasari, due to his territory having no defense when most of his military was sent for the Pamalayu Expedition. Jayakatwang easily occupied the capital, took power and moved the center of government to his ancestral land, Kadiri.

==== Majapahit Empire ====
Majapahit territory in Java, Malang was capital of mancanegara (province) Tumapel.

Malang was not the center of the power struggle between Jayakatwang, Raden Wijaya, and Kublai Khan's army from Mongol. After winning the succession of power, Raden Wijaya, who held the title of Kertarajasa Jayawardhana moved the center of power to the area he had built in the Tarik Forest (now around Mojokerto and District Tarik, Sidoarjo). However, the Malang region witnessed history from the fate of Jayakatwang who was exiled to another spring in Polaman (now Kalirejo Village, Lawang District, Malang Regency). According to Pararaton and Kidung Harsyawijaya, this was where Jayakatwang was inspired to write Wukir Polaman, his last literary work before being executed by Raden Wijaya.

In the Majapahit government structure according to the Waringin Pitu Inscription (AD 1447), the Malang region is included in the Bhumi or the capital of empire. He is a nagara (provincial equivalent) named Tumapel which is led by a rajya (governor) or natha (master) or bhre (nobleman / prince) —such as dukes.

Negarakertagama also recorded King Hayam Wuruk's visit to several places in the Malang region in 1359 AD. According to Yudi Anugrah Nugroho, the tour was part of a series of trips by King Hayam Wuruk to review the development around Lumajang. This visit is usually done when the harvest period is over. There are at least two contexts of the tour, namely recreation and pilgrimage. For the recreational context, the first place was Kasuranggan Park in the Sumberawan area (Toyomarto Village, District Singosari, Malang Regency). It was here that King Hayam Wuruk built a stupa as a place of worship for Buddhists so that it became the Sumberawan Temple as it is now. The second is Kedung Biru. Some historians connect Kedung Biru with the location now called Dusun Biru, Gunungrejo Village, District Singosari, Malang Regency. It is called kedung (meaning: ravine) because it is on the edge of a cliff near the Klampok River. In addition to the recreational place of Raja Hayam Wuruk, it is said that this place is a sanctuary for kris made by Mpu Gandring and other royal weapons. The third is the Bureng area identified as the Wendit natural bath in Mangliawan Village, District Pakis, Malang Regency.

For the context of pilgrimage, King Hayam Wuruk visited several heritage temples of the Singhasari Kingdom which aimed to dharma the ancestors (Wangsa Rajasa). Some of the temples visited include Kidal Temple (in honor of King Anusapati), Jago Temple (in honor of King Wisnuwardhana), and Candi Singasari (in honor of Raja Kertanegara). Especially for Singasari Temple, there is debate about whether it was built during the reign of Singhasari or Majapahit Kingdom. Because, according to the National Library of the Republic of Indonesia, Singosari Temple was built around 1300 AD (the reign of King Raden Wijaya) as a temple of respect, if not dharma, Raja Kertanegara along with Jawi Temple. However, there is an argument which states that this temple was being built during the reign of King Kertanegara itself as a public worship temple. The consequence of this last argument is that the construction of the temple was not completed due to the occupation of Singhasari by Jayakatwang.

The Malang region (Tumapel) became one of the objects of political conflict when the Regreg war erupted (1404–1406). This area is claimed by Aji Rajanata, Bhre Wirabhumi II (Blambangan, Banyuwangi). However, the claim was opposed by Manggalawardhana, Bhre Tumapel II, who was still the son of King Hayam Wuruk. Therefore, this area is considered as the frontline of the battle involving Majapahit (West) and Blambangan ('East Majapahit). However, because Regreg war was won by King Wikramawardhana, Tumapel returned to Majapahit power.

When the Majapahit Kingdom received Admiral Cheng Ho from China (Ming dynasty) in 1421 AD, he agreed with King Wikramawardhana (1389–1429 AD) to place Ma Hong Fu and Ma Yung Long as ambassadors of the Ming dynasty at Tumapel. This can be attributed to Admiral Cheng Ho's diplomatic efforts to ensure the security of ethnic Chinese in the Majapahit region. During the War of Regreg (1406), around 170 delegates from the Ming dynasty were sent by Admiral Cheng Ho to re-establish diplomatic relations between China and Majapahit after the conflict of the Jayakatwang-Raden Wijaya-Kublai Khan in the era of transition from Singhasari to Majapahit. However, all the envoys were massacred by King Wikramawardhana who could not distinguish their arrival status as an enemy or not. The role of Admiral Cheng Ho was also significant for the Malang region (Tumapel) in 1432 when he was with his subordinates, Gan Eng Cu and (Duke (Bhre) of Arya Teja I of Tuban) and his younger brother, Gan Eng Wan, helped Ratu Maharani Sri Suhita (1429–1447 AD ) to unite Daha (Kadiri) and Tumapel after internal conflict. For his services, Bro Eng Wan was given the title Raden Arya Suganda was appointed as an official at Tumapel.

==== Sengguruh Kingdom ====
Sengguruh is the last Hindu kingdom and the rest of the heritage of Majapahit sympathizers in Malang. He was an independent kingdom after the fall of Majapahit. Hermanus Johannes de Graff argued that the son of the Brawijaya VII, Raden Pramana fled to the remote mountain region in the south due to the occupation of Daha (Kadiri) (capital of Majapahit since Girindrawardhana – Brawijaya VI) by Sultan Trenggana from Demak in 1527. The leader of this region is Arya Terung with the title Adipati Sengguruh. The name Sengguruh is said to be related to the existence of an education center and the residence of the knights or banner (commonly called Kepanjian or Kepanjen area). The banners who want to study in Kepanjen are said to be saying "Let's go to the Teacher" which refers to the place where they study. These words gradually became Sengguruh.

According to Babad ing Gresik (Chronicles of Gresik), the kingdom had tried to attack the Lamongan and Giri (Gresik) areas in 1535. However, the efforts of Arya Terung were unsuccessful, if not failed to maintain their occupation of the two regions. In fact, according to the records in Tedhak Dermayudan, after the failure of the conquest, Arya Terung adopted Islam and spread Islamic teachings throughout Sengguruh. As a result, the Majapahit sympathizers led by Raden Pramana rebelled and made the Arya Terung flee north around the lower reaches of the Brantas River. With the help of Sultan Trenggana who had conquered the former capital of the Singhasari Empire in 1545. Sengguruh succeeded in quelling the rebellion. Raden Pramana fled towards Blambangan. In Serat Kanda, Sultan Trenggana once again appointed Arya Terung as Duke of Sengguruh which was under the Demak Sultanate. In addition, the Malang area after the conquest of Sultan Trenggana changed to Kutho Bedah ("The Destructed City"). Sengguruh Kingdom remains in the form of ruins in Sumedang Hamlet of Jenggala Village (on the west side of Sengguruh Village), in Kepanjen District, Malang Regency.

=== Dutch East Indies ===
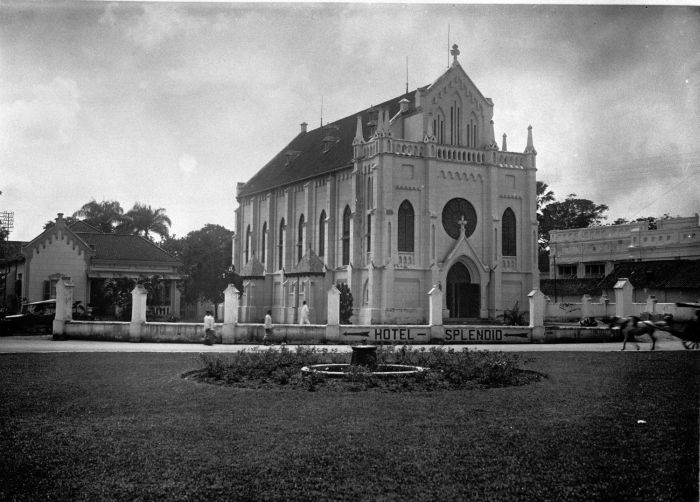
Kayutangan Cathedral is one of the Dutch architecture heritages in Downtown Malang

Coat of Arms of Malang during Dutch colonial era, this version granted in 1921.

The city was capital city of Singhasari in 1222, then transferred to Dutch colony. Malang was modernized under the Dutch; its mild climate which results from its elevation, along with its proximity to the major port of Surabaya, made it a popular destination for the Dutch and other Europeans. Malang began to grow and develop rapidly and various economic sectors of the community were increasing, especially the need for space to carry out various activities. As a result, there was a change in land use which was marked by a built up area that appeared uncontrollably. Changes in land functions undergo rapid changes, such as from functioning land agriculture becomes a functioning land of housing and industry. In 1879, Malang was connected to Java's railroad network, further increasing development and leading to increased industrialization. On 1 April 1914, Malang was designated gemeente (city).

=== Japanese occupation ===
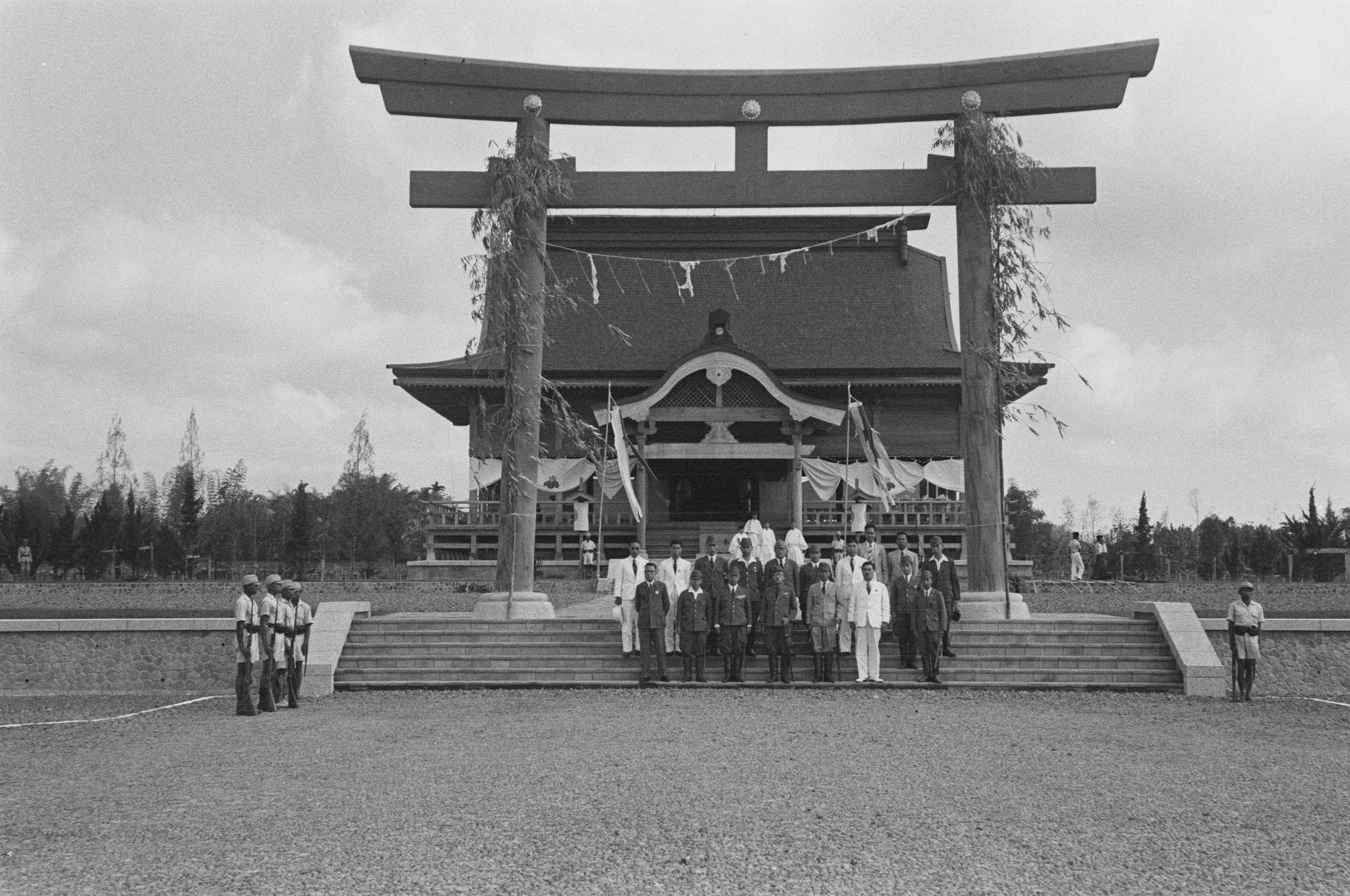
Ching Nan Shrine in Malang was one of 11 Shinto shrines built in Indonesia during the Japanese occupation.

During the Japanese occupation in Indonesia, Malang was also occupied by Japan. Imperial Japanese Army began occupying Malang on 7 March 1942. Malang, which was then led by Raden Adipati Ario Sam (R.A.A. Sam), surrendered to the Japanese who were then in power in Malang. Taking over the Government in principle continues the old system (Gemeente), only the designations in positions are replaced with Japanese. During the Japanese occupation there was a shift in the function of local buildings. The houses where the Dutch lived were transferred to Japanese use. The Dutch building on Jalan Semeru (which was used as an office or the headquarters of the Dutch troops,) was converted into a Kempetai building and a Shinto shrine was also built in the city. The Kentapetai building became one of the historical buildings in Malang, which is now a private vocational school building and witnesses the disarmament of the Japanese by the People's Security Agency (BKR) in order to strengthen the defence of Malang.

Chinese businessman, investor, and philanthropist Tan Kah Kee who's based in Singapore before the war. He was responsible for gathering much financial support from the community to aid China in the war. I fled to Malang and went hidden until the war is over. In 1943, while he was in Java, Tan began writing his memoirs, The Memoirs of an Overseas Chinese of the Southern Ocean (南僑回憶錄; 南侨回忆录; Nánqiáo Huíyìlù), which later became an important document of the history of the overseas Chinese in Southeast Asia.

=== Independence of Indonesia ===
After Independence of Indonesia in 1945, Malang became part of the Republic of Indonesia on 21 September 1945 and re-entered on 2 March 1947 after being re-occupied by the Dutch East Indies. The government was changed to Malang City Government on 1 January 2001 based on second amendments of Indonesia's Constitution.

Along with growth came urbanization. The government could not satisfy the population's needs for affordable housing, which led to the building of shanty towns along the rivers and rail tracks. Today, the shanty towns still exist; although some have been transformed into "better" housing.

== Geography ==
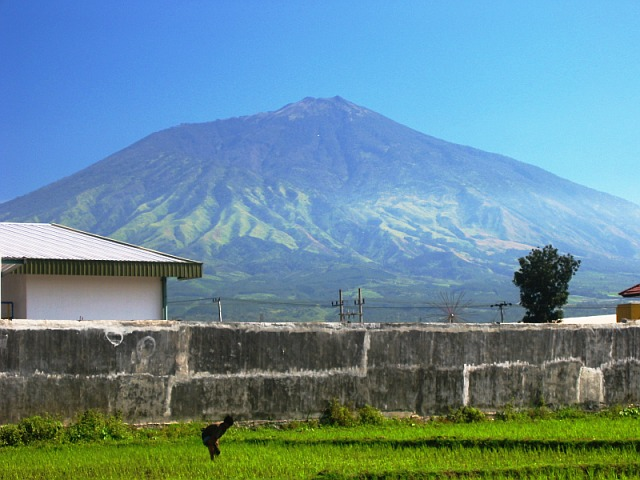
Mount Arjuno viewed from Singosari, Malang Regency.

Malang is located in the middle of Malang Regency and south side of Java Island. The city has an area of 111.08 square kilometres (42.89 sq mi). The city is bordered by Singosari and Karangploso Districts on the north side; Pakis and Tumpang Districts on the east side; Tajinan and Pakisaji Districts on the south side; and Wagir and Dau Districts on the west side which are all districts of Malang Regency.

The parts of Malang have their own characteristics so that they are well-suited for various activities. The southern part of Malang is a large enough plateau that is suitable for industry, the northern part is a fertile highland that is suitable for agriculture, the eastern part is a plateau with less fertile soil, and the western part is a vast plateau and is now an educational area.

Malang City is passed by one of the longest rivers in Indonesia and the second longest in Java after Bengawan Solo, the Brantas River whose source is located on the slopes of Mount Arjuno in the northwest of the city. The second longest river in Malang is the Metro River which passes through Malang in Karangbesuki village, Sukun District.

The city of Malang is located at a plateau. The city lies at an altitude between 440 and 667 metres above sea level. The city's highest point is in CitraGarden City Malang, a real estate development, while the lowest area of Malang is in the Dieng area.

The city of Malang, together with the surrounding districts of Malang Regency, is surrounded by mountains and mountain ranges. The city is surrounded by Mount Arjuno in the north; Mount Semeru to the east; Mount Kawi and Mount Butak in the west; Mount Kelud in the south. The popular active volcano Mount Bromo is about 25 km (16 miles) east of the city, and in November 2010, the airport was closed for nearly a week due to airborne ash from an eruption.

=== Cityscapes ===
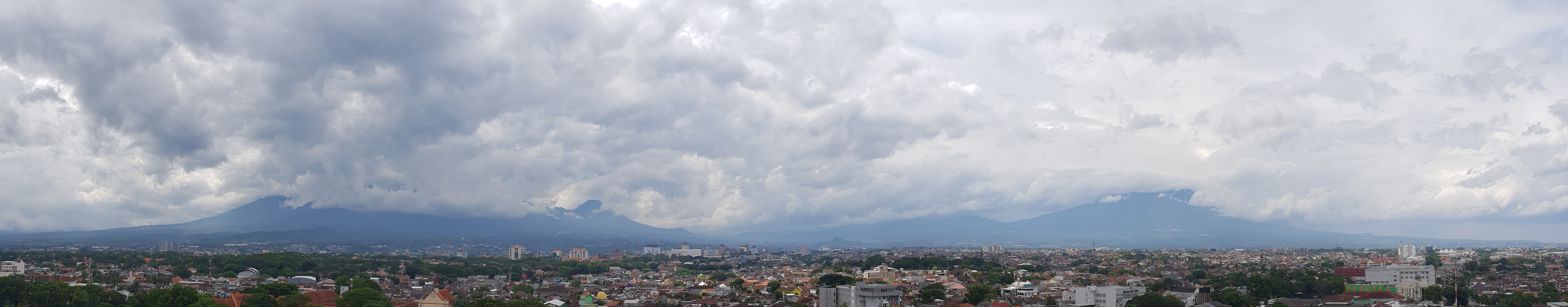
Panorama view of Malang city with Arjuno-Welirang and Kawi Butak mountains covered by Cumulonimbus cloud in January 2019.
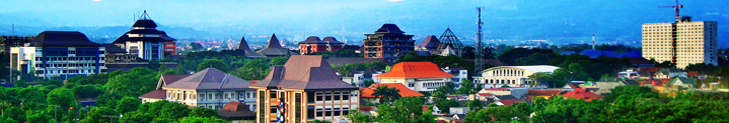
The view of West Malang from State University of Malang tower. University of Brawijaya's rectorate and main library building can be seen as a tower on the left side of the picture.

=== Climate ===
Malang features a tropical monsoon climate (Köppen Am) as the rainfall throughout the year is greatly influenced by the monsoon. The driest month is August with an average rainfall of 15 mm (0.59 inches), while the wettest month is December with an average rainfall of 362 mm (14 inches). The temperature is moderated by the altitude, as the city is located at 506 metres or 1,660 feet above sea level. The hottest month is October with an average of 24.5 °C (76.1 °F), while the coolest month is July with an average of 22.6 °C (72.7 °F).

Climate data for Malang, elevation 590 m (1,940 ft), (1991–2020 normals)
Month	Jan	Feb	Mar	Apr	May	Jun	Jul	Aug	Sep	Oct	Nov	Dec	Year
Mean daily maximum °C (°F)	27.1 (80.8)	27.3 (81.1)	27.5 (81.5)	27.7 (81.9)	27.9 (82.2)	27.5 (81.5)	27.3 (81.1)	27.9 (82.2)	29.2 (84.6)	29.5 (85.1)	28.3 (82.9)	27.2 (81.0)	27.9 (82.2)
Daily mean °C (°F)	23.6 (74.5)	23.7 (74.7)	23.8 (74.8)	23.9 (75.0)	23.8 (74.8)	23.1 (73.6)	22.6 (72.7)	22.7 (72.9)	23.7 (74.7)	24.5 (76.1)	24.2 (75.6)	23.6 (74.5)	23.6 (74.5)
Mean daily minimum °C (°F)	21.5 (70.7)	21.5 (70.7)	21.5 (70.7)	21.4 (70.5)	20.8 (69.4)	19.8 (67.6)	18.9 (66.0)	18.7 (65.7)	19.7 (67.5)	20.9 (69.6)	21.5 (70.7)	21.5 (70.7)	20.6 (69.2)
Average rainfall mm (inches)	350 (13.8)	335 (13.2)	335 (13.2)	255 (10.0)	107 (4.2)	65 (2.6)	27 (1.1)	15 (0.6)	32 (1.3)	106 (4.2)	285 (11.2)	362 (14.3)	2,274 (89.7)
Average rainy days	21	20	19	17	10	6	2	1	3	9	18	21	147
Average relative humidity (%)	89	89	89	88	85	84	81	78	76	77	84	89	84
Mean daily sunshine hours	6	7	7	8	8	9	9	10	10	9	7	6	8
Source: World Meteorological Organization

== Administration ==
The city of Malang was previously led by Mayor Sutiaji from 2018 until 2023. The city's legislative body, the DPRD Kota Malang has 45 seats, in which, following the 2023 elections, the largest groups are the PDI-P (9 seats), PKB (8 seats), PKS (7 seats), Golkar Party (6 seats) and Gerindra (6 seats). The members are elected every five years.

Malang is divided into five districts (kecamatan), tabulated below with their areas and their populations at the 2020 Census and according to the official estimates for mid 2025. The table also includes the locations of the district administrative centres, the number of administrative villages or subdistricts (urban kelurahan) in each district, and their postal codes.

Districts of Malang by area and population
Adm. no.	District	Adm. center	Area in km^{2}	Pop'n. Census 2020	Pop'n in mid 2025	No. of Villages	Postal codes
35.73.03	Kedungkandang	Buring	39.852	207,428	219,147	12	65132 – 65139
35.73.04	Sukun	Bandungrejosari	20.864	196,300	207,449	11	65146 – 65149
35.73.02	Klojen	Gadingkasri	8.829	94,112	100,705	11	65111 – 65119
35.73.01	Blimbing	Arjosari	17.731	182,331	192,345	11	65121 – 65126 ^{[a]}
35.73.05	Lowokwaru	Tulusrejo	23.801	163,639	172,213	12	65141 – 65145
35.73	Malang	Klojen	111.077	843,810	891,859	57	65111 – 65149

Note
a. Except for kelurahan of Jodipan (which has a post code of 65137).

The names of the kelurahan are as follows (with their post codes):

- Kedungkandang:
1. Arjowinangun (65132)
2. Bumiayu (65135)
3. Buring (65136)
4. Cemorokandang (65138)
5. Kedungkandang (65137)
6. Kotalama (65136)
7. Lesanpuro (65138)
8. Madyopuro (65139)
9. Mergosono (65134)
10. Sawojajar (65139)
11. Tlogowaru (65133)
12. Wonokoyo (65135)
- Sukun:
1. Bakalankrajan (65148)
2. Bandulan (65146)
3. Bandungrejosari (65148)
4. Ciptomulyo (65148)
5. Gadang (65149)
6. Karangbesuki (65149)
7. Kebonsari (65149)
8. Mulyorejo (65147)
9. Pisangcandi (65146)
10. Sukun (65147)
11. Tanjungrejo (65147)
- Klojen:
1. Bareng (65116)
2. Gadingasri (65115)
3. Kasin (65117)
4. Kauman (65119)
5. Kiduldalem (65119)
6. Klojen (65111)
7. Oro-Oro Dowo (65119)
8. Penanggungan (65113)
9. Rampal Celaket (65111)
10. Samaan (65112)
11. Sukoharjo (65118)
- Blimbing:
1. Arjosari (65126)
2. Balearjosari (65126)
3. Blimbing (65125)
4. Bunulrejo (65123)
5. Jodipan (65137)
6. Kesatrian (65121)
7. Pandanwangi (65124)
8. Polehan (65121)
9. Polowijen (65126)
10. Purwantoro (65122)
11. Purwodadi (65125)
- Lowokwaru:
1. Dinoyo (65144)
2. Jatimulyo (65141)
3. Ketawanggede (65145)
4. Lowokwaru (65141)
5. Merjosari (65144)
6. Mojolangu (65142)
7. Sumbersari (65145)
8. Tasikmadu (65143)
9. Tlogomas (65144)
10. Tulusrejo (44141)
11. Tunggulwulung (65143)
12. Tunjungsekar (65142)

== Government ==
=== Mayor ===
The Mayor of Malang is the highest-ranking official within the Malang City government. He reports to the Governor of East Java. The current mayor or regional head of Malang City is Wahyu Hidayat, with Ali Muthohirin as vice mayor. They took office on 20 February 2025.

== Demographics ==
Malang municipality had a population of 843,810 at the 2020 Census, and the official estimate as at mid 2025 was 891,859, with about 3.1 million clustering in the Malang Valley, making it the province's second most populous city.

=== Ethnic backgrounds ===
The racial makeup of the city is mainly Javanese, with small percentages of Madurese, Chinese and Arab descent. Compared with other Javanese people, the Javanese people of Malang have a hard and egalitarian character.

=== Religion ===
Religion in Malang (2024)
Religion	Percentage
Islam	90.56%
Protestantism	5.39%
Catholicism	3.46%
Buddhism	0.43%
Hinduism	0.14%
Others (Note: Including Confucianism and Indigenous religion.)	0.02%

Up until the 14th century, Malang was part of an Indianized majority Hindu-Buddhist kingdom like most of Java. Now a majority of Malang residents are Muslims. There are minorities of Protestants, Catholics, Hindus, Buddhists and Confucians.

Many buildings of worship still stand from their construction in the colonial era. For example, the City of Malang Grand Mosque (Masjid Agung Jami Kota Malang — مسجد ملانغ الكبير) in Malang City Square (Alun-alun Kota Malang); the Catholic Church of the Sacred Heart of Jesus (Gereja Katolik Hati Kudus Yesus) in Kayutangan; Saint Mary from Mount Carmel Cathedral (Gereja Ijen or Katedral Santa Maria dari Gunung Karmel) on Jalan Ijen, which is the seat for the Roman Catholic Diocese of Malang; the Immanuel Protestant Church in Alun-alun; and Eng An Kiong Confucian Temple (Klenteng Eng An Kiong — 永安宮廟) in Jl. Laksamana Martadinata No. 1 Malang.

Malang is famous for being a center of religious education. This is evident with the existence of many Islamic schools (madrasahs and pesantren) and Christian bible seminaries. Malang has several convents and monasteries: Carmel Monastery, Ursuline Convent, Misericordia monastery, Monastery of Our Lady of the Sacred Heart Brothers, Convent of the Sisters of the Blessed Virgin Mary, Monastery Mission Congregatio Brother, Brother Abbey Projo, Passionist Monastery, and several others.

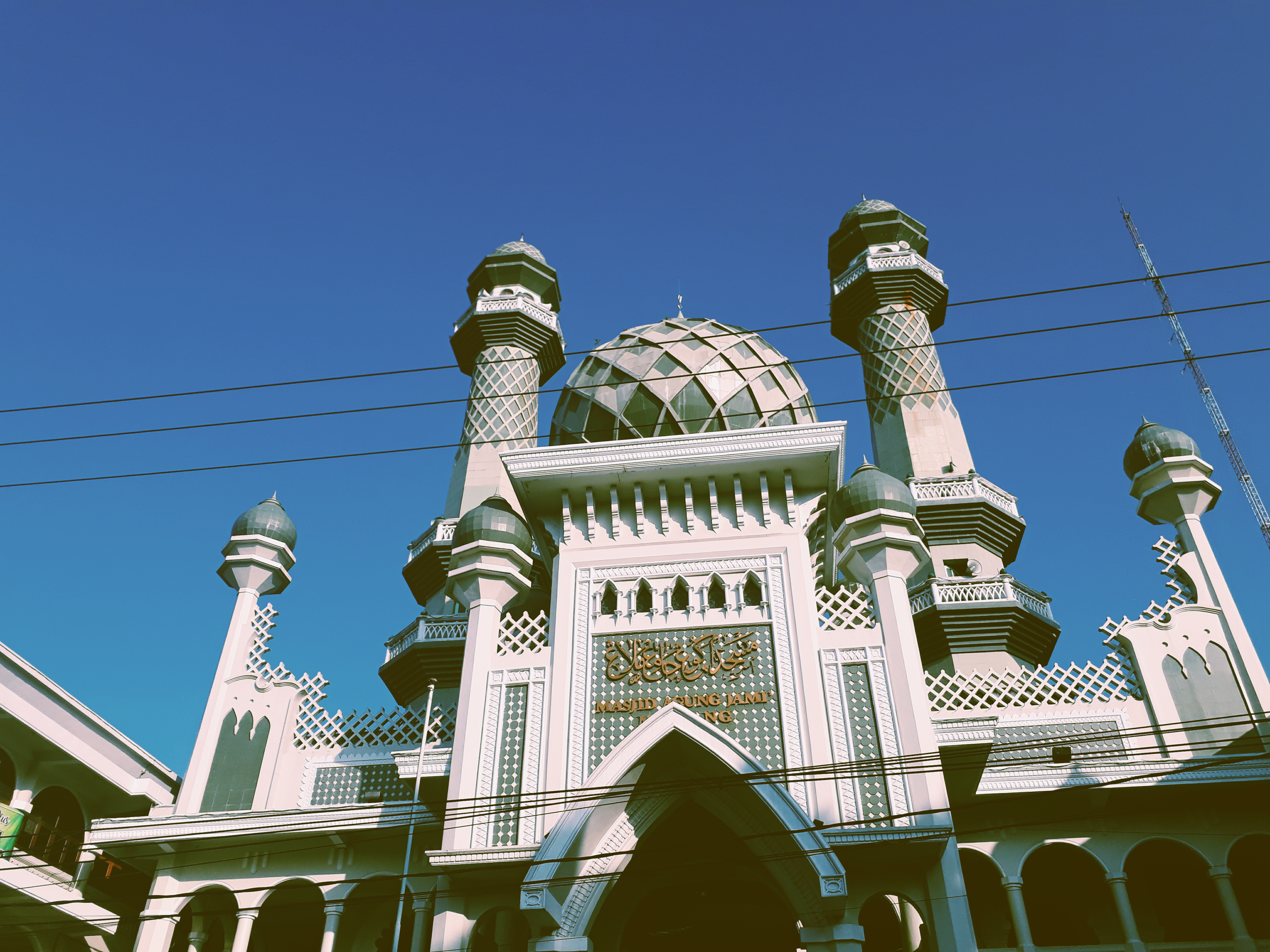
Masjid Agung Jami Malang

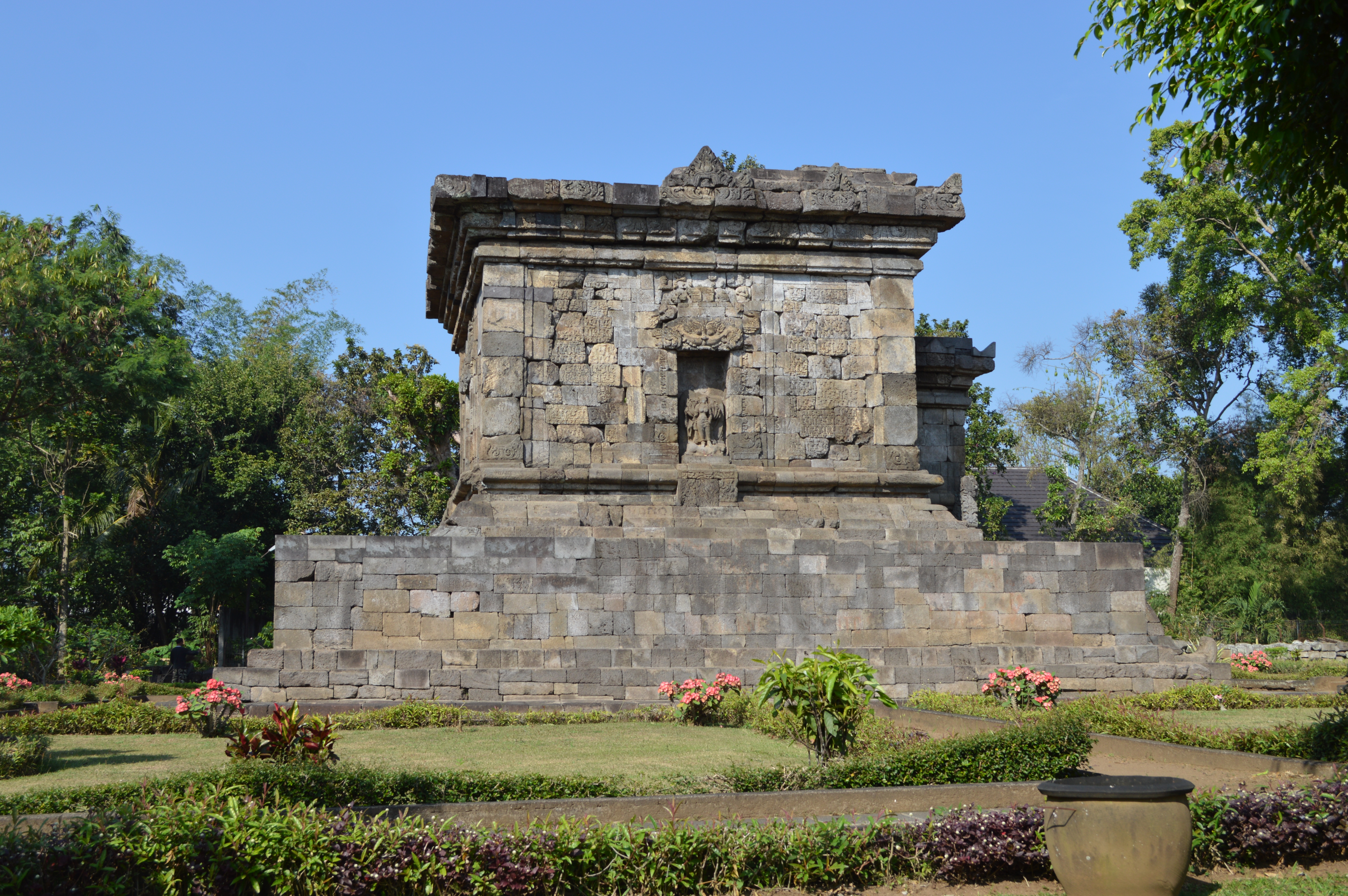
Candi Badut

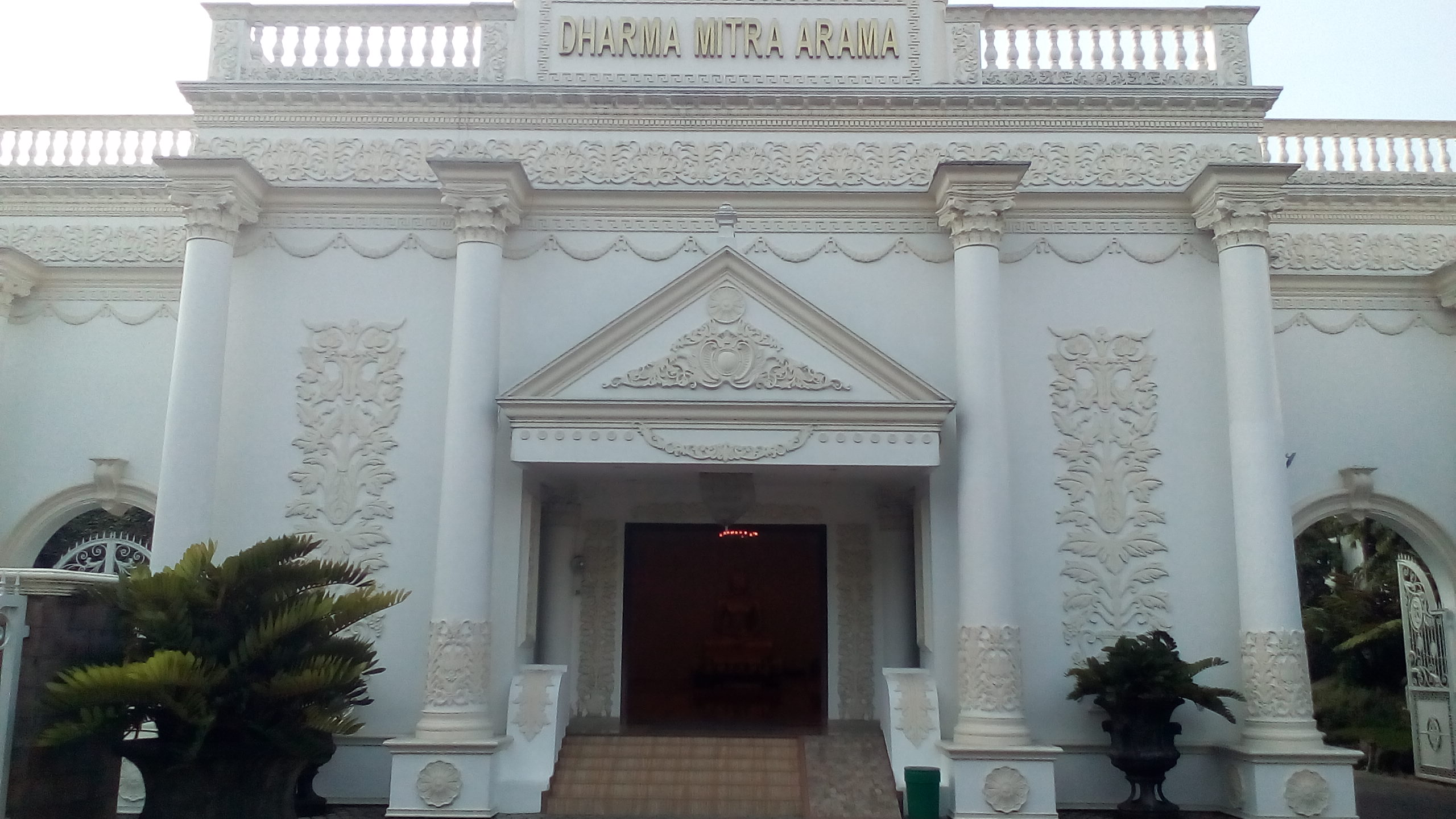
Buddhist Vihara Dharma Mitra

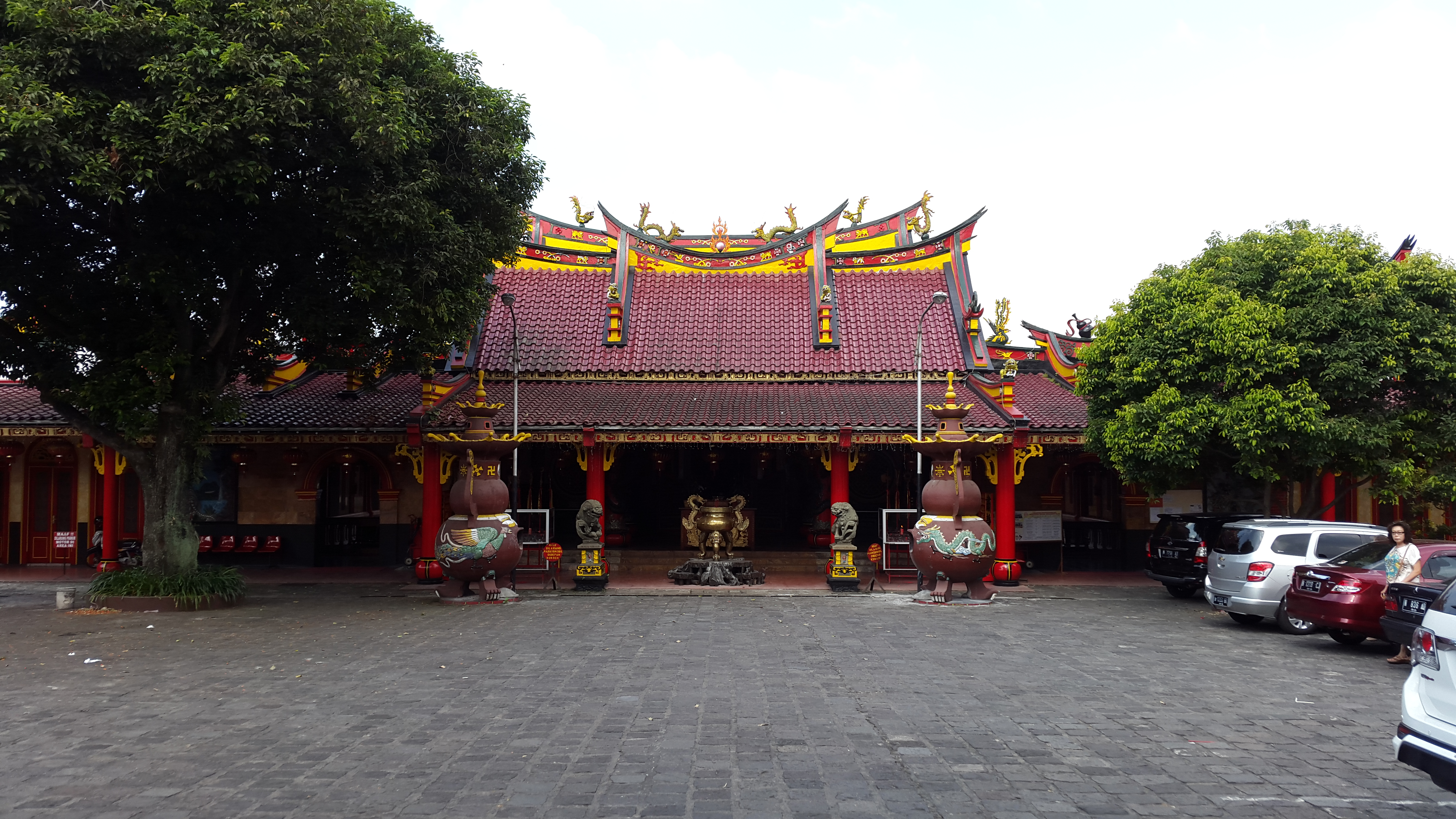
Eng An Kiong Chinese Temple

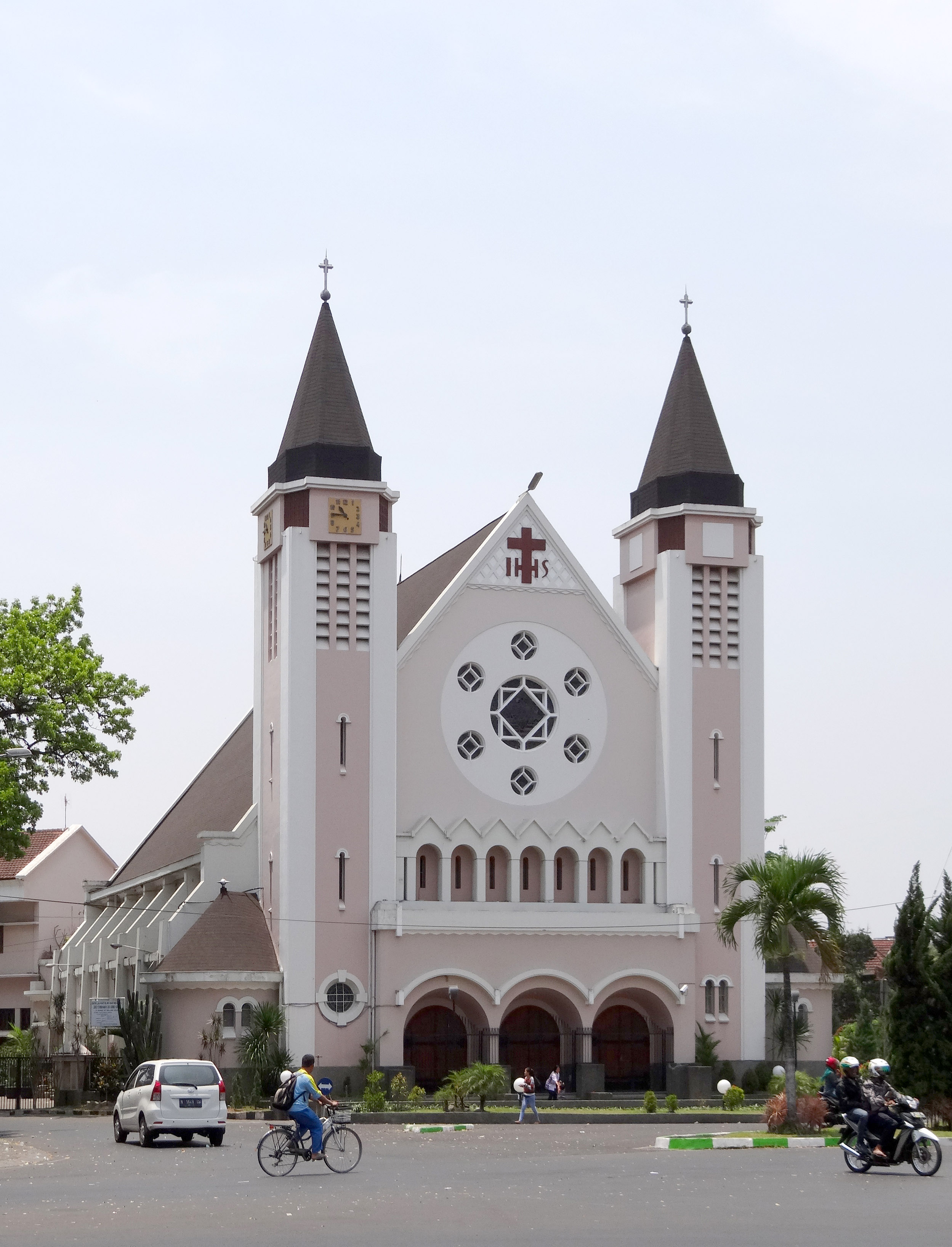
Cathedral of Our Lady of Mount Carmel, Malang

=== Language ===
The Arekan dialect of the Javanese language is the day-to-day language used in Malang. Like those of Surabaya, citizens of Malang adopt an egalitarian form of Javanese. As becomes a center of educational, there are many languages from outside Java spoken in Malang.

Many native Malang youths adopt a dialect that is called "Boso Walikan". This is a form of language game that consists of reversing the pronunciation of the words, e.g. "Malang" becomes "Ngalam".

=== Non-residents ===
Temporary residents in Malang are mostly there for educational reasons. They come from other islands, mainly in East and Central Indonesia, which includes Bali, Madura, Sulawesi, Nusa Tenggara, Papua, and Maluku. There are also a large number of students originating from Jakarta, West Java, Sumatra and Borneo.

== Economy ==
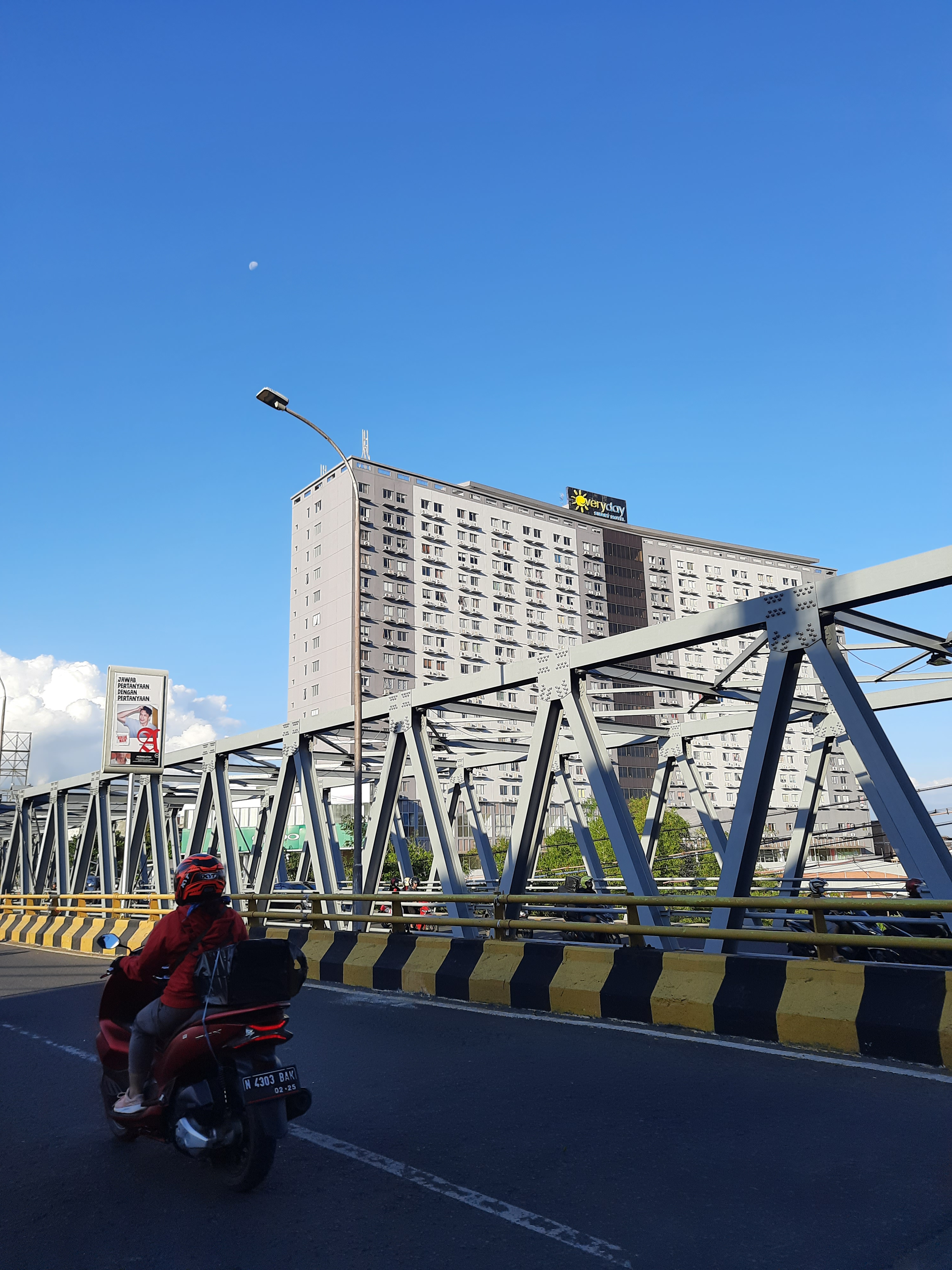
A motorist passing by the "Suhat Bridge" with a highrise apartment building visible in the background.

Malang has a developed and diverse economy and is also an economic area highlighted by the East Java Provincial Government. The gross regional domestic product (GRDP) of Malang reached 57,171.60 billion rupiahs with economic contribution of 3.06% to the GRDP of East Java; Malang became the city with the third largest GRDP in East Java and second-level region (daerah tingkat II, includes regencies and cities) with the tenth largest GRDP in East Java. GRDP per capita of Malang City, which is 66,758,1 hundred thousand rupiahs is the sixth largest in East Java, after Pasuruan Regency. Malang has about 6,000 unemployed people with an open unemployment rate of 7.28%. The economy of Malang is supported by various sectors, including industry, services, trade, and tourism. Trade contributed the most, with 29.53% of the total GRDP of Malang City. Malang is also the home of one of the famous tobacco companies, namely Bentoel.

Malang implements a system of creative economy. This can be proved by the high role of micro, small and medium-sized enterprises (MSMEs) in the economy. The city government continues to encourage the development of MSMEs, among them by holding various expos and festivals. In addition to MSMEs, applications and digital games were made subsectors of the application of creative economy. Indirectly, this creative economy also increases the human development of Malang City.

In 2016, the economy of Malang grew by 5.61%. This rapid economic growth is being boosted by tourism. In addition, rapid economic growth was contributed by MSMEs, industry and trade.

Inflation in Malang is very low. In September 2017, Badan Pusat Statistik (BPS) noted that inflation in Malang was 0.05%. The underlying cause of inflation is the rise in the general consumer price index. Although low, Malang's inflation rate was once the highest in East Java, that is in July 2017 with inflation of 0.30%.

== Transport ==
=== Road ===
There are 2,960 roads in Malang with a total length of 1,027 kilometres (638 mi). This count does not include provincial and state roads. In addition to being located at Indonesian National Route 23, which connects it to Gempol and Kepanjen, Malang is also connected to provincial roads linking regencies and cities in East Java. To increase connectivity in East Java, toll roads are being built, one of them is the Pandaan-Malang Toll Road. This toll road will end in Madyopuro, Kedungkandang. Now the toll has entered the construction phase.

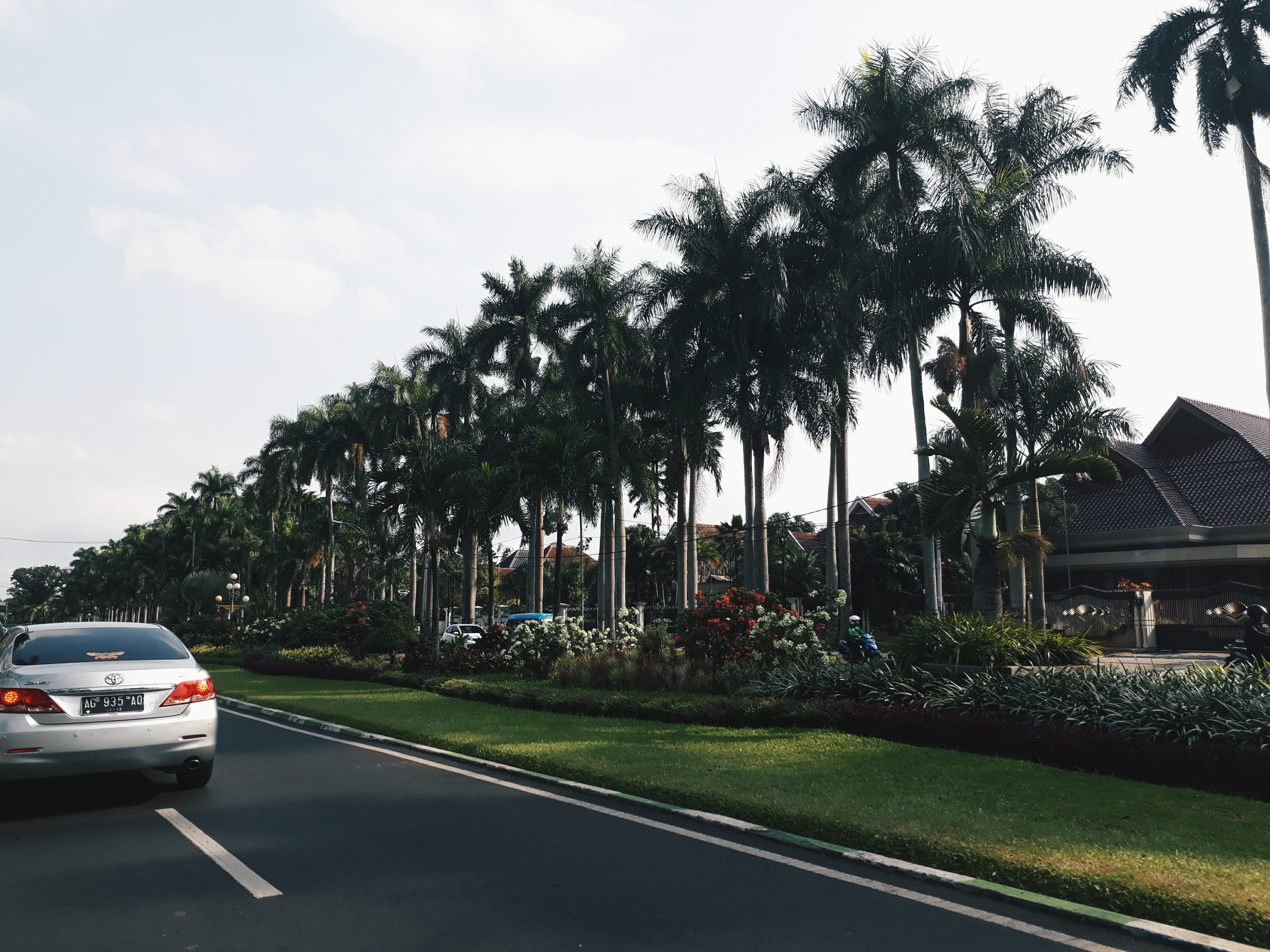
The Famous Idjen Street

On 28 May 2006, a blow-out occurred during drilling for an exploration of natural gas in Porong, Sidoarjo Regency. The blow-out initially produced 5,000 m^{3} (180,000 cu ft) of mud flow per day. 18 months after the incident, the mudflow is estimated to be 80,000 to 100,000 m^{3} (2,800,000 to 3,500,000 cu ft) per day. This ongoing mudflow has forced the closure of the Porong-Gempol toll road in East Java, which effectively cut off the transport line from Surabaya to Malang. In mid-2015, a new highway — Gempol-Pandaan Toll Road — opened for the public to ease transport from Malang to Surabaya and Pasuruan to Surabaya, vice versa.

The primary public transportation is microvans (most of them are Suzuki Carry), painted blue for legal public use. Those microvans are called Angkot both officially and casually (from Angkutan = transportation and Kota = city) but some locals prefer to call it by the name Mikrolet. They are operated privately and cheap, around IDR 4,000 each boarding, but the angkots are usually cramped. The Department of Transportation of Malang operates angkots and school buses. Both services serve both the city centre and the suburbs. There are now 25 angkot routes in the city. The school buses began operating on 29 December 2014 and there are now six school buses with six routes. Malang has a large intercity bus terminal, Arjosari, located in Blimbing, North Malang. Gojek and Grab operate in Malang. A protest was held by angkot and taxi drivers opposing these companies on 20 February 2017, leading Gojek to close its office in Malang temporarily.

According to INRIX, Malang is one of the most congested cities in the world with total time spent in a year in congestion of 39.3 hours (20% of total time). According to a Brawijaya University survey, 46.2% of city residents consider congestion in the city to be severe. This congestion also eliminates the convenience of the tourists. The city government has tried to overcome it by planning the development of monorail and underpasses. However, after conducting several comparative studies, the government stated that Malang is unable to build monorails and underpasses because it is very expensive.

=== Railway ===
The Malang Station, located in the centre of Malang, is the main railway station of the city and serves 832,181 passengers with the number reaching 5 thousand people per day on the mudik of 2017. The station is the largest railway station in Malang and connects Malang with other major cities in Indonesia such as Surabaya, Bandung, and Jakarta. It is near Malang City Hall and some other governmental and primary public services. The station is frequently called as the Malang Kotabaru Station to distinguish it from Malang Kotalama Station which is located in Sukun, South Malang. There is also a small railway station, Blimbing located in Blimbing, North Malang which is strategically located near five and four-star hotels and the city's business and commercial district.

To ease commuters from Yogyakarta to Malang vice versa, on 20 May 2012 Malioboro Express (Moleks) has been operated.

Previously, there was a tram system in Malang, but now it is defunct.

=== Air ===
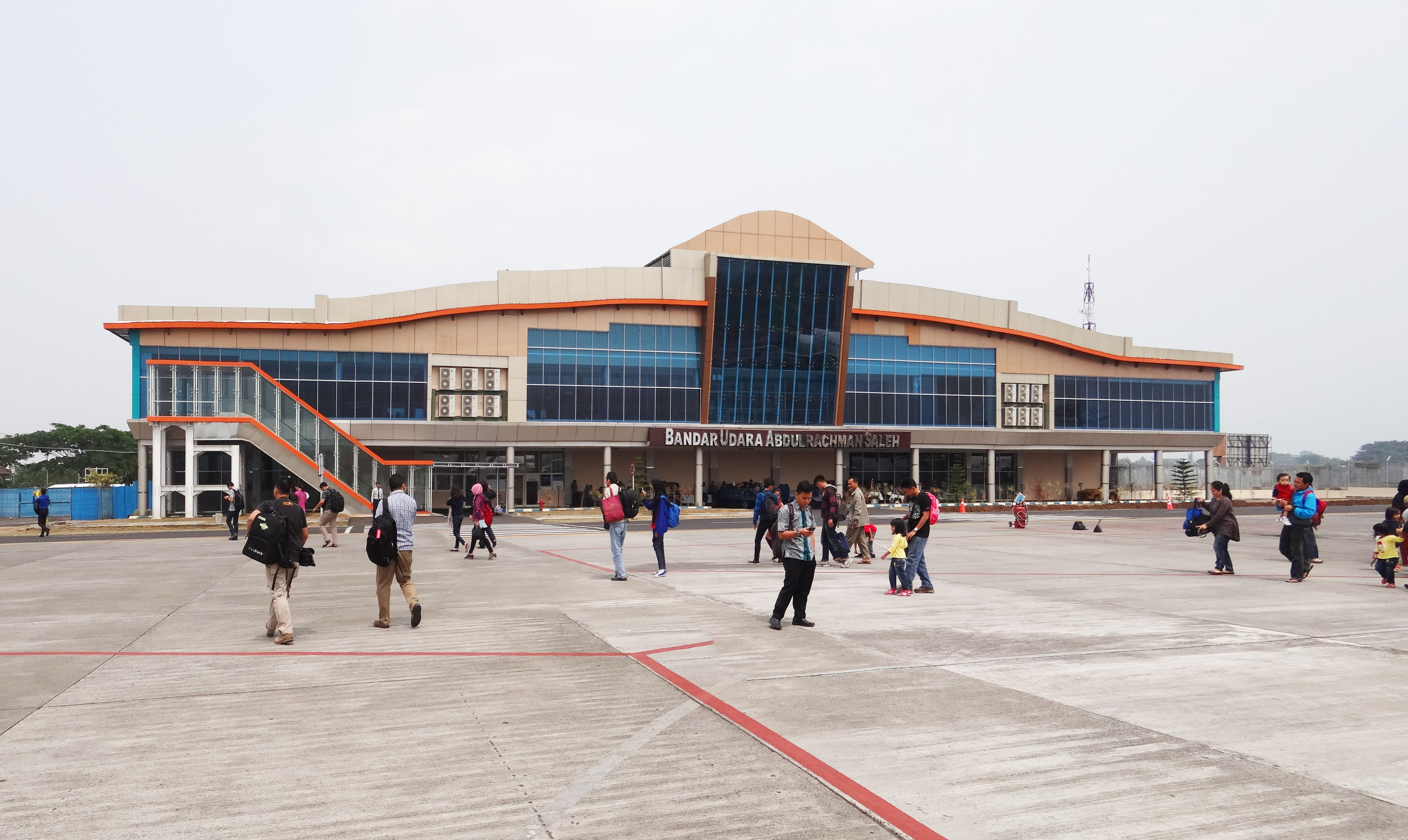
Abdul Rachman Saleh Airport

Malang is served by 2 airports in the region. Abdul Rachman Saleh Airport is located closer to the city center. This airport connects the city to domestic cities including Jakarta and Denpasar. The other airport is Juanda International Airport in Sidoarjo Regency which is located 96 km from the city center and serves both International and Domestic flights. Both airports can be accessed by bus, taxis and travel cabs.

== Education ==
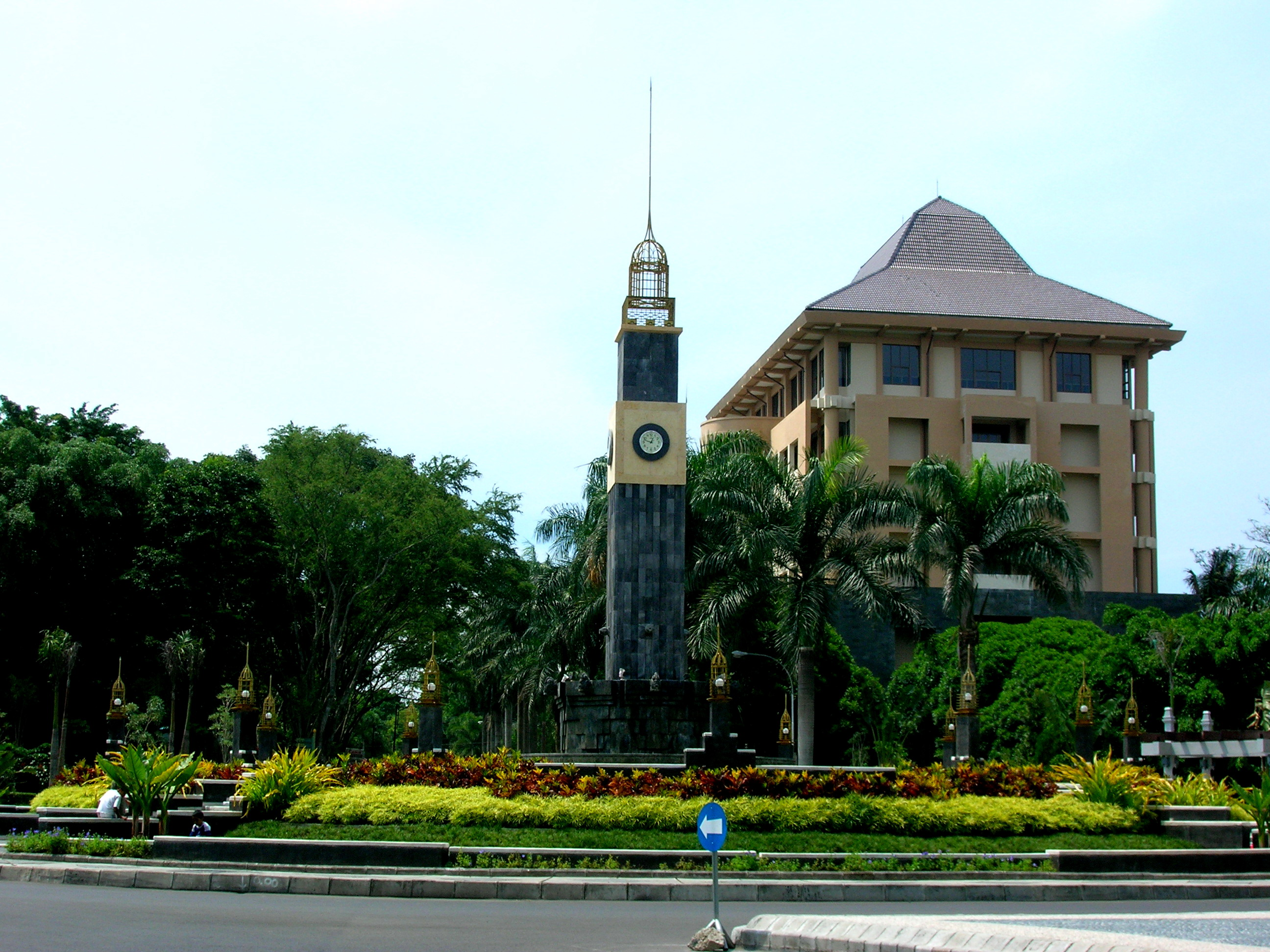
University of Brawijaya rectorate campus

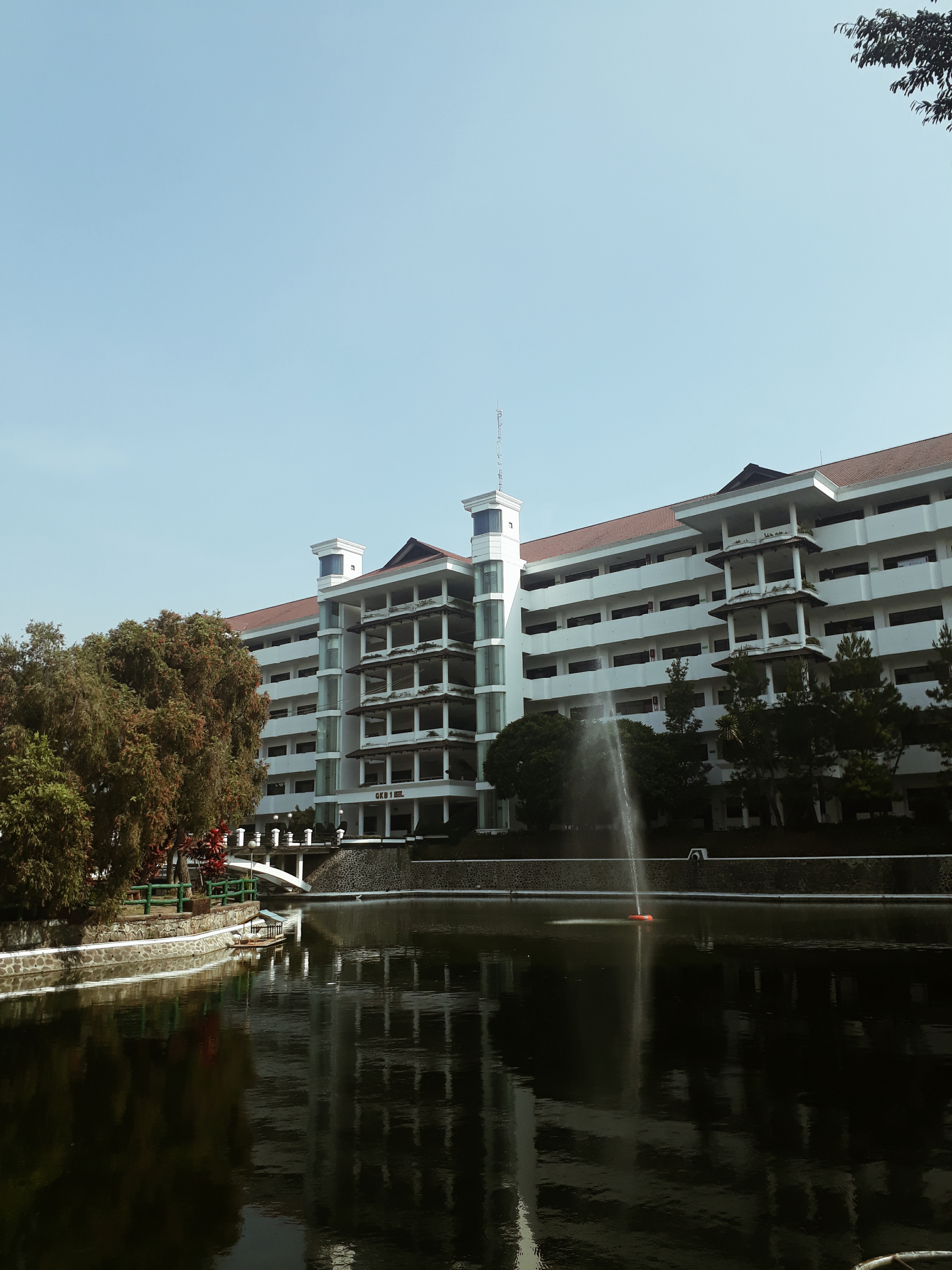
General Education building at the Muhammadiyah State University of Malang

Malang has a strong reputation throughout Indonesia as a center for higher education and learning. The following higher education institutions are located in the city:

Public institutions:

- University of Brawijaya (UB)
- State University of Malang (UM)
- State Polytechnic of Malang (POLINEMA)
- Islamic State University of Maulana Malik Ibrahim (UIN MALIKI)

Private institutions:

- Muhammadiyah University of Malang (UMM)
- Ma Chung University
- Bina Nusantara University of Malang (BINUS Malang)
- Islamic University of Malang (UNISMA)
- Catholic University of Widya Karya Malang (UKWK)
- South East Asia Bible Seminary – SAAT
- STIE Malangkuçeçwara
- Widyagama University of Malang (UWG)
- Institut Teknologi Nasional Malang (ITN)
- Merdeka University (UNMER)
- Vocational and Educational Development Center Malang (VEDC Malang)
- IKIP Budi Utomo Malang
- Gajayana University of Malang (UNIGA)
- Universitas Kanjuruhan Malang (UNIKAMA)
- Institut Teknologi dan Bisnis ASIA Malang (ITB Asia)

Malang also has two elementary schools, high schools and two international schools, Wesley International School and Bina Bangsa School Malang.

== Healthcare ==
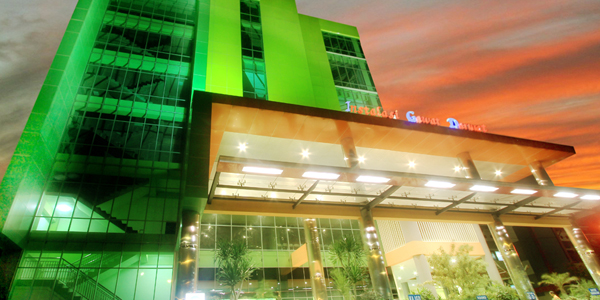
Saiful Anwar Hospital

Health services in the city are quite adequate. This is supported by the focus of the city budget carried out by the municipal government. In Malang, there are hundreds of hospitals, clinics, Puskesmas (community health centres), Posyandu (integrated health posts), and other health services. Provincial and municipal governments have hospitals in this city. The provincial government has a hospital of type A, the Dr. Saiful Anwar Regional General Hospital, while the city government has a smaller hospital, the Malang Regional General Hospital.

Dr. Saiful Anwar Hospital is the largest hospital in the city. The hospital is a referral hospital in southern East Java. Other public hospitals are the Malang City Hospital, Panti Nirmala Hospital, Lavalette Hospital, Hermina Tangkubanprahu Hospital, RSI Malang, and Persada Hospital.

Malang has many teaching hospitals. Dr. Saiful Anwar Hospital and University of Brawijaya Hospital accommodate by Faculty of Medicine of University of Brawijaya students. The University of Muhammadiyah Malang Hospital which accommodates Faculty of Medicine's students of the University of Muhammadiyah Malang.

== Culture ==
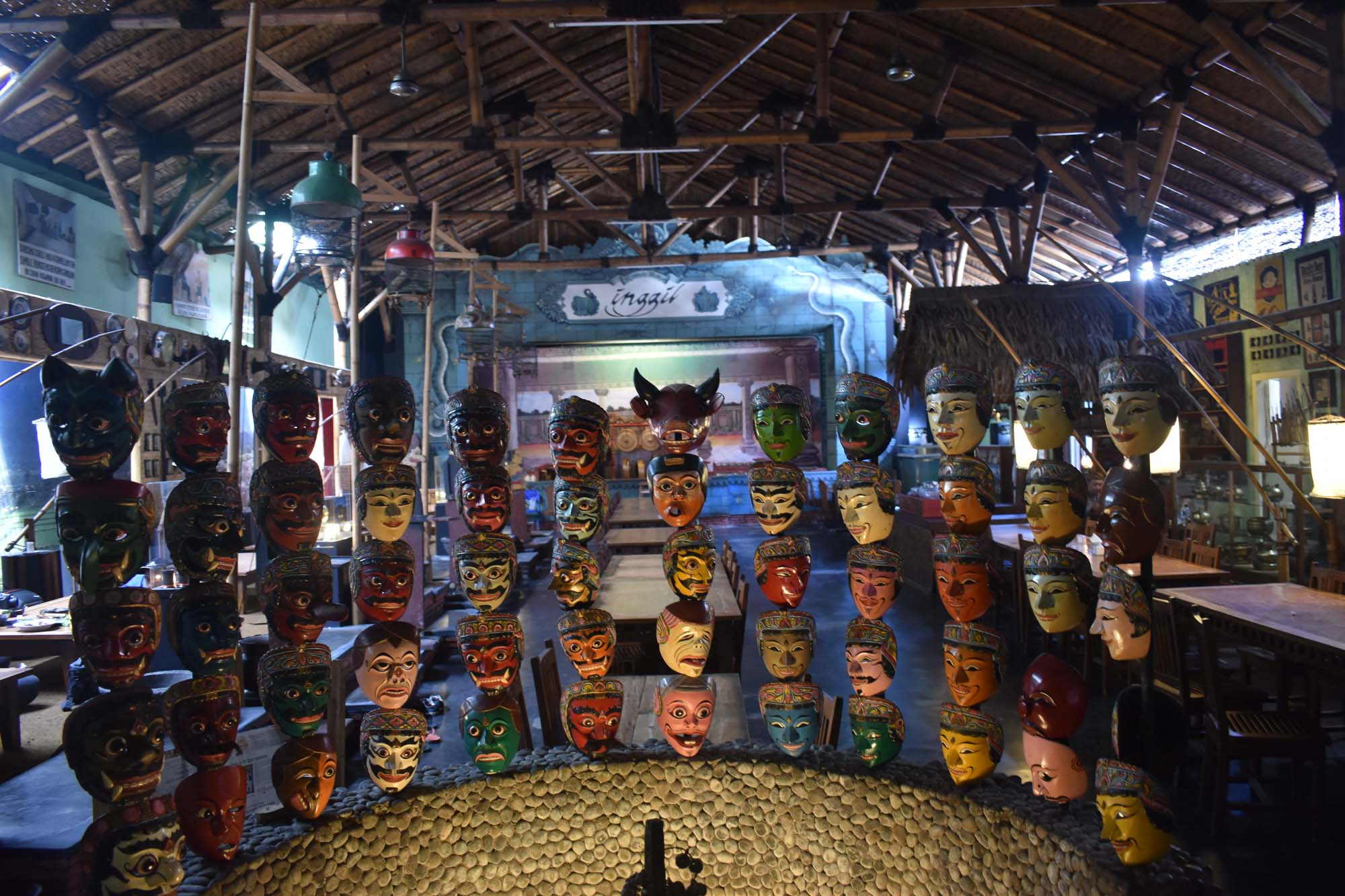
Topeng Malang Hall

As a center of tourism, Malang has various places of interest which can be classified into local, regional, national and international standards, including traditional dance performances such as Tari Topeng (Mask Dance), Jaranan Pegon (Divine Horse Dance), Tari Beskalan (Beskalan Dance), Tari Bedayan Malang (Welcome Guests Dance), and Tari Grebeg Wiratama (Soldier's Fame Dance). There is also 'Topeng' or mask handicraft in the villages of Jabung and Kedungmonggo, which have become a familiar landmark in Malang Regency.

Football is considered a second religion in Malang. The city is home to Arema FC, a popular football club in Indonesia which is also known in the AFC for its internationally acclaimed achievements.

Malang is also home to a large transgender (waria) community.

=== Historic landmarks ===
Because it has been inhabited since prehistoric, various prehistoric objects have been found in Malang. In Bakalankrajan, the people found mortar and dolmen. They also found mortar and scratch stones in Tlogomas which are stored in the Mpu Purwa Museum. In addition, the relics of the Hindu-Buddhist Kingdom did not lose. There has been found a Shiva sect of Hindu worship in the days of Singhasari or Majapahit in the place near McDonald's restaurant in Dinoyo named the Ketawanggede Site.

The most famous historical landmark is the relics of the Dutch era. There are historical objects such as ceramic paintings at Hotel Pelangi, Dutch heritage buildings on Jalan Ijen, and ancient buildings with colonial architecture style. The Jalan Ijen area is one of the legacies of architect Herman Thomas Karsten. The Dutch inherited utilities such as drainage. Small objects such as ancient Dutch guldier money were exhibited in 2013.

Islamic era landmarks include the Pondok Pesantren Bi Ba'a Fadlrah, a madrasa built in 1978 known for its eclectic architecture and bright white and blue tiled exterior.

=== Monuments ===
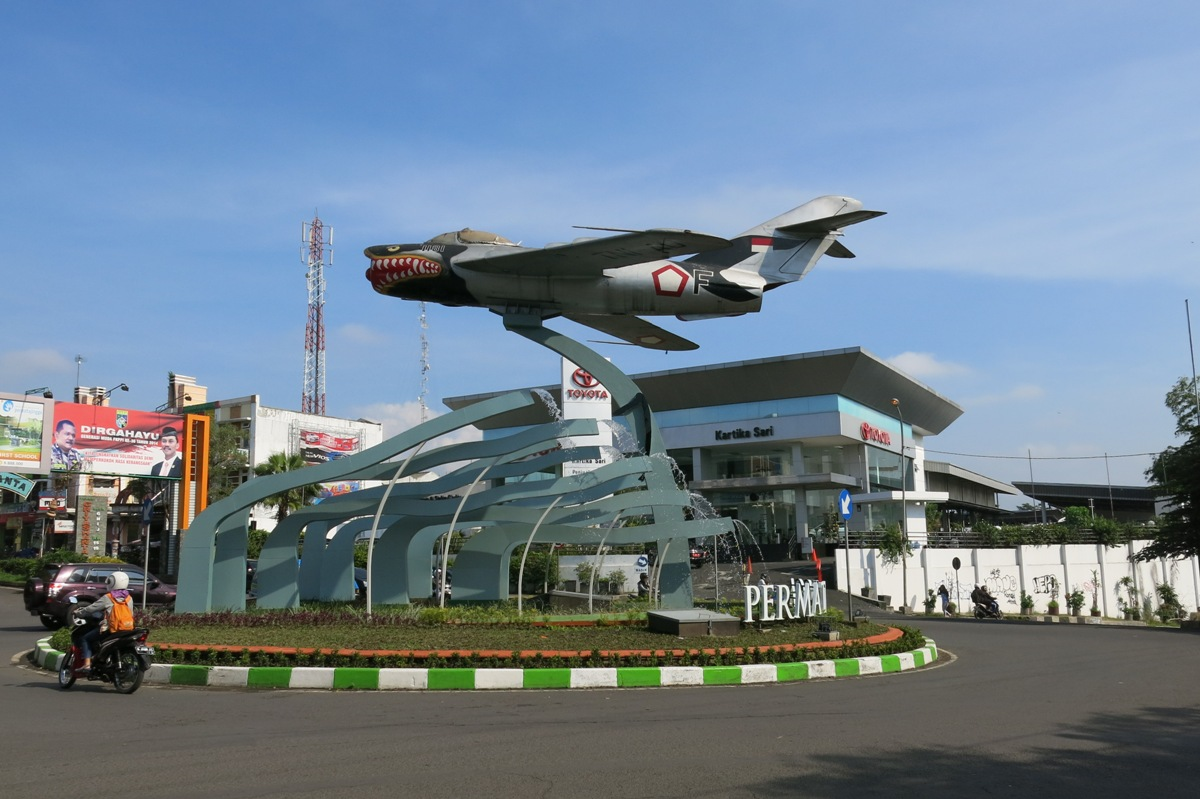
Mig-17 monument

As the main city in Indonesia, Malang is involved in various historical events that took place in Indonesia. To mark the event, various monuments and memorials were built that symbolized important historical events. Historic events, especially the struggle for independence which has the most monuments. These monuments include the Tugu Monument which signifies independence from the Dutch Empire; The TGP Monument (Army Genie Student) was built to commemorate the struggle of the TGP; Monument to the Heroes of the Army of the Republic of Indonesia Student (TRIP), monument to the triumph of the heroes of the TRIP; The Fighting Monument '45 which signifies the collapse of occupation; The Monument of Hamid Rusdi in memory of Hamid Rusdi; General Sudirman Monument that commemorates the struggle of Commander Sudirman; KNIP Malang Monument, the historical monument of the Central Indonesian National Committee (KNIP); and the Melati Monument (Suropati Cadet Monument), a monument to the awarding of emergency schools at the beginning of the formation of the People's Security Army (TKR).

Malang symbolizes various things through its monuments. One of them is the historic heritage of Indonesia, namely the MiG-17 Aircraft Monument with the NATO code "Fresco" located on Jalan Soekarno-Hatta. This monument is a symbol of the strength of the Air Force. This aircraft was used during the Trikora and Confrontation Operations. There is also the Statue of Ken Dedes Monument located at the entrance to the northern side of Malang. In Malang there is also a national poet monument, Chairil Anwar, located on Jalan Basuki Rahmat. To symbolize Malang's contemporary history and identity, various monuments were built. Adipura Monument which is located on Jalan Semeru which signifies Adipura achievement by Malang. As Bhumi Arema, there is the Singo Edan Monument located in Taman Bentoel Trunojoyo and the Arema Monument which is located on Jalan Lembang to symbolize the pride of Malang people to their football club, Arema FC.

=== Museums ===
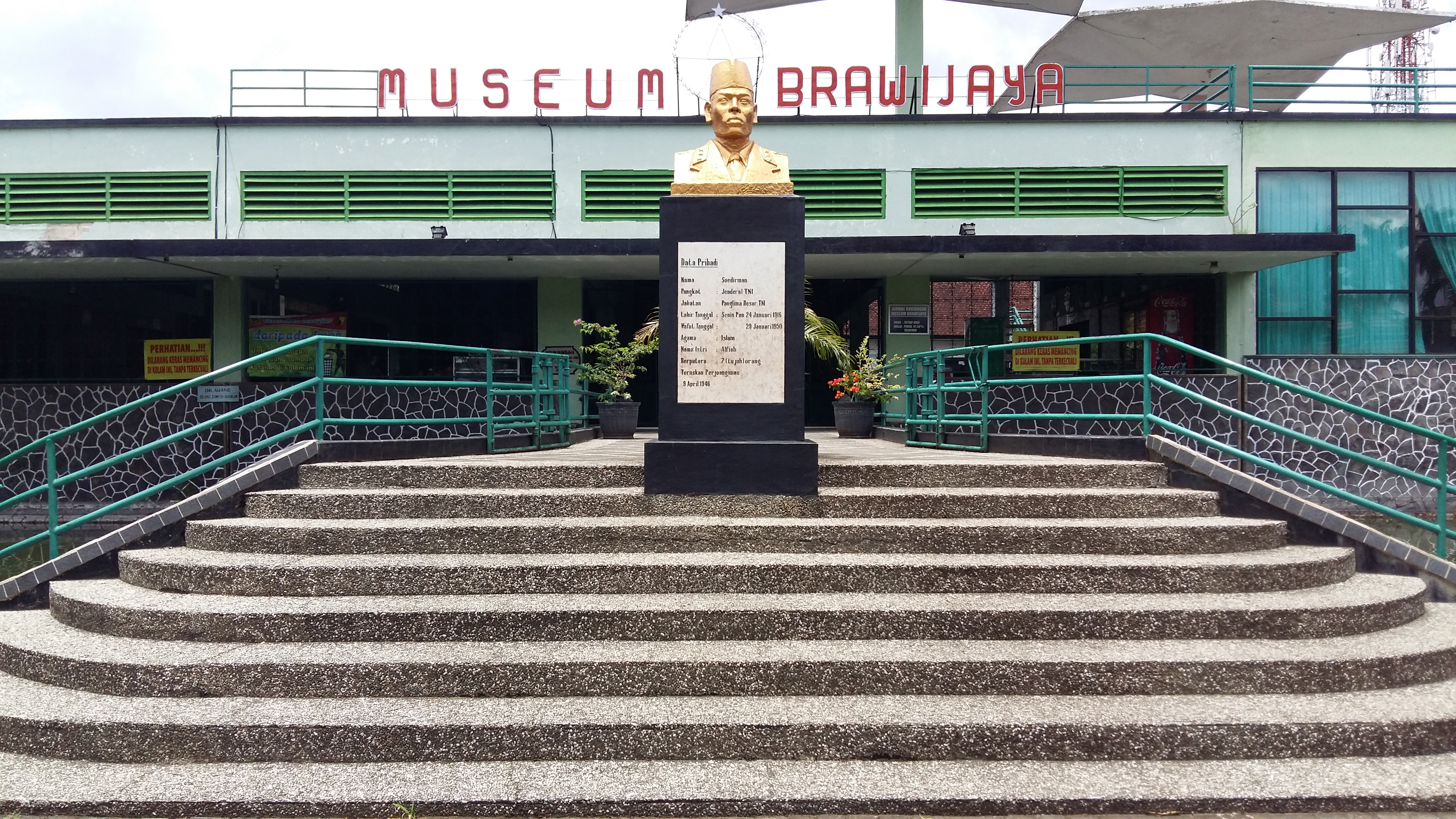
Brawijaya Museum with Statue of Sudirman

Malang, which is a center of settlements since ancient times, has many historical relics ranging from prehistoric relics to the relics of the 1990s. In this city, the museums already exists to the sub-district level. Museums that store these relics include the Mpu Purwa Museum, a museum containing Hindu-Buddhist relics, Malang Tempo Dooe Museum, Malang historical museum, and Brawijaya Museum, the independence war museum. There is also a museum that leaves the historical heritage of a giant Indonesian company, the Bentoel Museum which contains the history of Bentoel Group and its founders.

As one of the most important educational cities since the Dutch East Indies, Malang also has a lot of scientific heritage left behind by European and Indonesian scientists. Among the many museums that leave these relics, there is the Brother Vianney Zoological Museum which contains hundreds of collections of conological specimens and herpetology specimens.

=== Dances ===
Malang is a city that has various types of traditional dance. According to the cultural area (tlatah), Malang belongs to the Arekan Culture. Thus, art dances in the city, especially dance art are more energetic, joyful, and straightforward. Malang dances vary, ranging from welcome dances, namely Beskalan dance, respect dance such as Bedayan dance, to Grebeg Wiratama dance which describes the spirit of war. Although there are many dances besides these dances, the famous Malang dance is the famous Mask Dance. The dance is a dance art performance where all characters use masks. In general, dances often use banner stories, stories of classical Javanese land.

In addition to dance, the city also has art in the form of performances. The most famous show is the Banteng show. This art developed in villages rooted in the history of Singhasari in the district. However, even some areas in the very modern city still have the Bantengan community. This art involves bull ancestors who were summoned by elders. Bantengan is considered unique, but there are local people who oppose it. Malangan Braiding Line is no less exciting. This show is an art performance that displays a group of people who are ready to act with a braid line (piggyback). Sometimes, Jaran Kapan dancers get tranced state.

=== Cuisine ===
Malang is a well-known culinary city at affordable prices. The affordable culinary variety is among the major reasons why the city has become one of the best cities to study in Indonesia, especially for university students. Dishes typical of Malang, Javanese cuisine, domestically Indonesia cuisine, Chinese cuisine, Indian cuisine, Arab cuisine and European cuisine in Malang. In regard to food, Malang is also known to have many warung that have lasted for decades. These shops, among others, Toko Oen which was established in 1930; Warung Tahu Telur Lonceng which was established in the early 1900s until it was referred to as colonial-era food to millennials; and Gerai Putu Lanang Celaket which was established in 1935.

Culinary tourism in the city was mixed with the Malang Tempo Doeloe Festival. In the festival, a variety of ancient culinary offerings, ranging from cenil, putu, to grendul, were sold. Ancient snacks such as sugar cane, cotton candy, and miller crackers were also sold at the festival. Cotton candy is sold in various forms such as corn, dragons or flowers.

== Sport ==
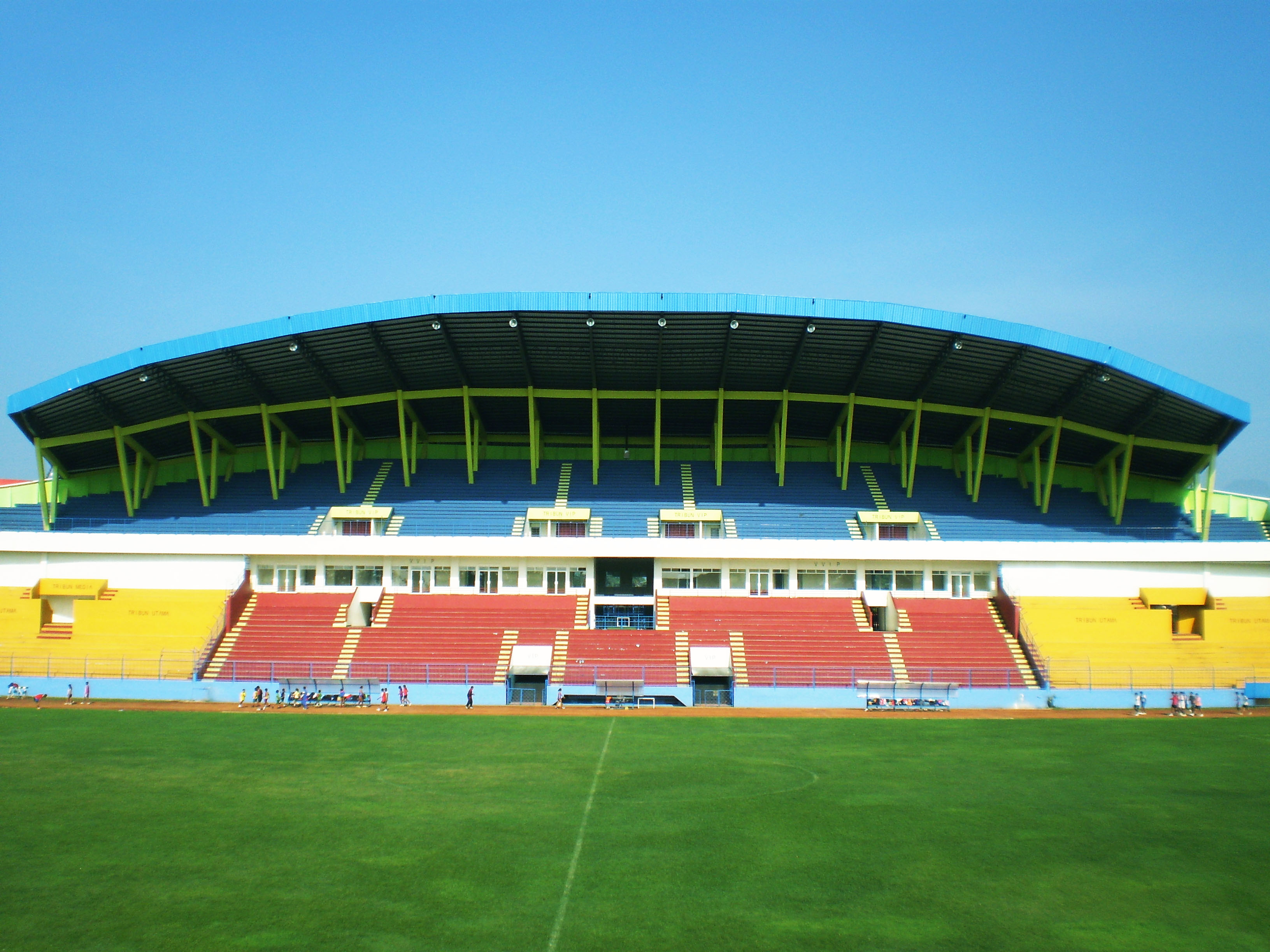
Gajayana Stadium

Arema F.C. is the city's most widely supported football team and plays in the Indonesian top league, the Liga 1. Its home is Kanjuruhan Stadium, located in Kepanjen, Malang Regency. Arema FC has a loyal and large fanbase, those fans are called Aremania. There was also other football club, it goes by the name Persema Malang and Sumbersari F.C., they play in Liga 3.

Malang also has a stadium in Klojen, Central Malang, it is known officially as Gajayana Stadium. Currently it is mostly used for major city events and athletics using its running track. There is also a swimming pool, tennis, basketball, badminton and weightlifting facilities near the stadium area as Central Sports Center. Another large sports center which goes by the name Rampal Sports Center is located near a military base in Kedungkandang, East Malang.

The city is also home to the professional basketball team Bimasakti Nikko Steel Malang, which plays in the Indonesian Basketball League.

On 1 October 2022 a fatal stampede occurred following a match between Arema F.C. and Persebaya Surabaya. More than 100 fans and two police officers were killed.

== Environment ==
=== Parks ===
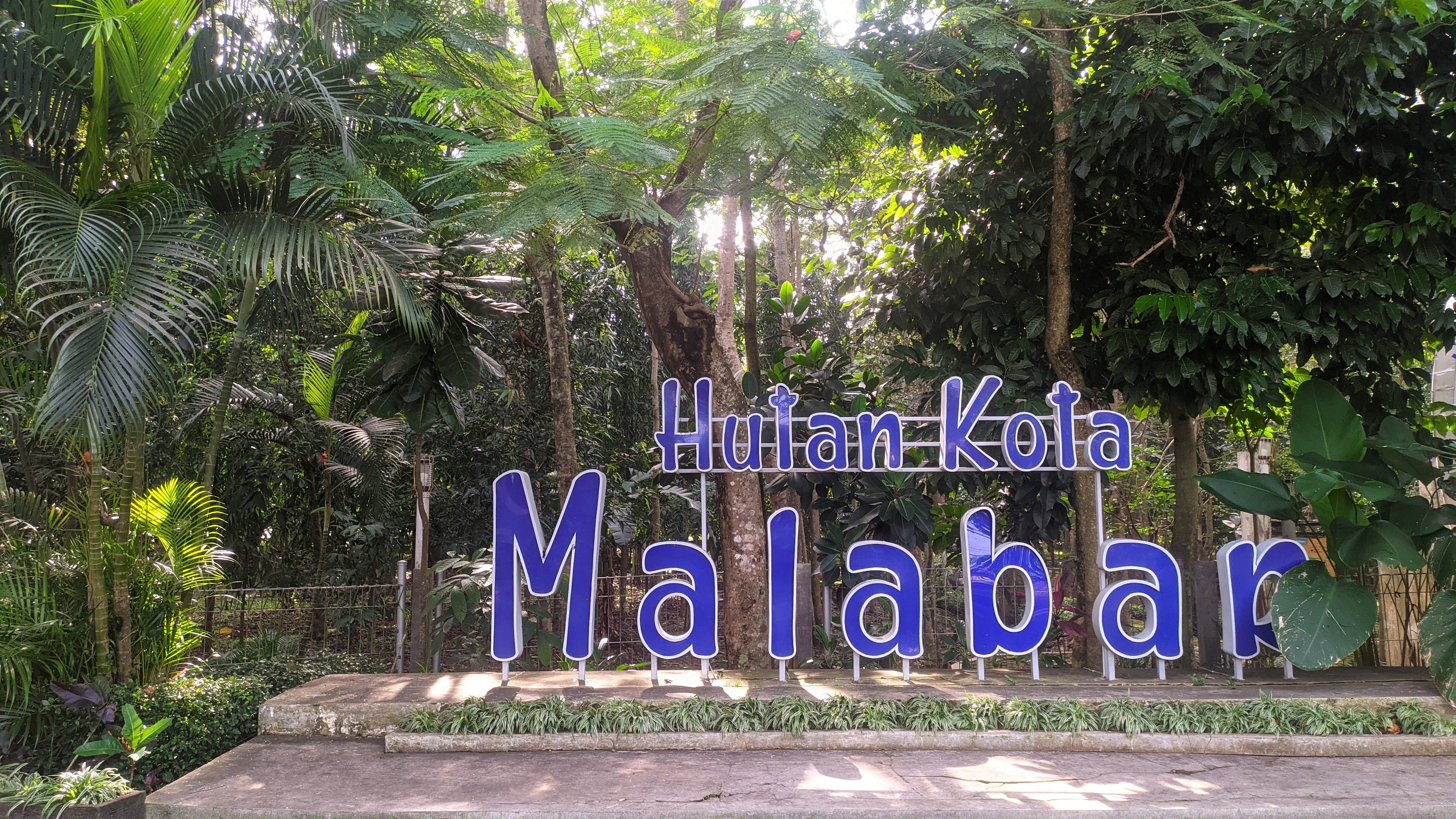
Malabar City Forest

According to research by The Clean Cities Air Partnership Program (CCAP), Malang is one of the five cities with the cleanest air in Asia. This achievement is one of the results of the community's commitment to continue to cultivate and beautify the city parks. Parks in Malang are known to be clean and have playing facilities so that Malang is considered to be a child-friendly city. The city government also created thematic parks, which helps the city to achieve the Best City Park in Indonesia award. Thematic parks can be found on the green way on Jalan Jakarta, namely the Taman Kunang-Kunang (Firefly Park).

The biggest parks in Malang are the Merdeka Square and Tugu Square (Tugu Malang Monument). Merdeka Square is located in front of the Malang Regent's Office and is the oldest square built in 1882. Not only that, Merdeka Square also provides a children playground and a fountain. Tugu Square which is located right in front of the Malang City Hall is decorated by the Tugu Malang, fountains, flowers, ponds with lotuses, typical flowers of Malang, palm trees, and plastic lamps shaped like sunflowers. Although intended for aesthetic elements, the sunflower lights were protested by the local residents because they were considered to be environmentally unfriendly and did not look good.

Some parks are the result of development from CSR funds. One of these is the Slamet Park which was built with CSR funds from PT Bentoel Prima. Bentoel's CSR fund was also used to renovate that park and Taman Trunojoyo. One of the famous parks, the Singha Merjosari Park was also renovated with CSR funds. However, the CSR funds used are funds from telecommunications companies. CSR funds from educational institutions such as the Merdeka Education Foundation that manages the Merdeka Malang University have also provided CSR to revitalize the Dieng Canal Park.

=== Awards ===
In the environmental field, Malang has won several awards including Adipura (given to the cleanest cities in Indonesia), Adiwiyata, and others. In addition, Malang is the city with the highest number of Adiwiyata schools in Indonesia, namely 173 schools from elementary to junior high schools. The Department of Environment of Malang City also received the 2017 Water Supply and Environmental Health (Air Minum dan Penyehatan Lingkungan, AMPL) award from the Head of the National Development Planning Agency. AMPL was achieved by the city because the city was able to reduce solid waste in 2016 by 15.1% and the coverage of access to waste management was 74.8%. In 2017, the city won the Wahana Tata Nugraha award because it was able to transform the slum environment into a tourist attraction such as the Jodipan Tourism Village. The many awards obtained by the city also had an impact on the increase in Regional Incentive Funds (Dana Insentif Daerah, DID) from 7.5 billion rupiahs in 2017 to 25.5 billion in 2018.

=== Conservation efforts ===
The government plays an active role in environmental conservation efforts. In achieving the Adipura Kencana, the education office held the Green School Festival (GSF) which was held annually in schools in the city. The method of implementing the GSF is considered good because it is forcing the participation of all schools. In addition, the Department of Housing and Settlements (Disperkim) also conducted a garden arrangement competition by realising the importance of green open space, and also actively built parks in the city. The city of Malang also seeks to utilise additional funds such as CSR funds to revitalise city parks.

== Twin towns – sister cities ==
- Fuqing, China
- Maebashi, Japan

== See also ==
- Greater Malang
