= Klojen =

- District
- Kecamatan Klojen
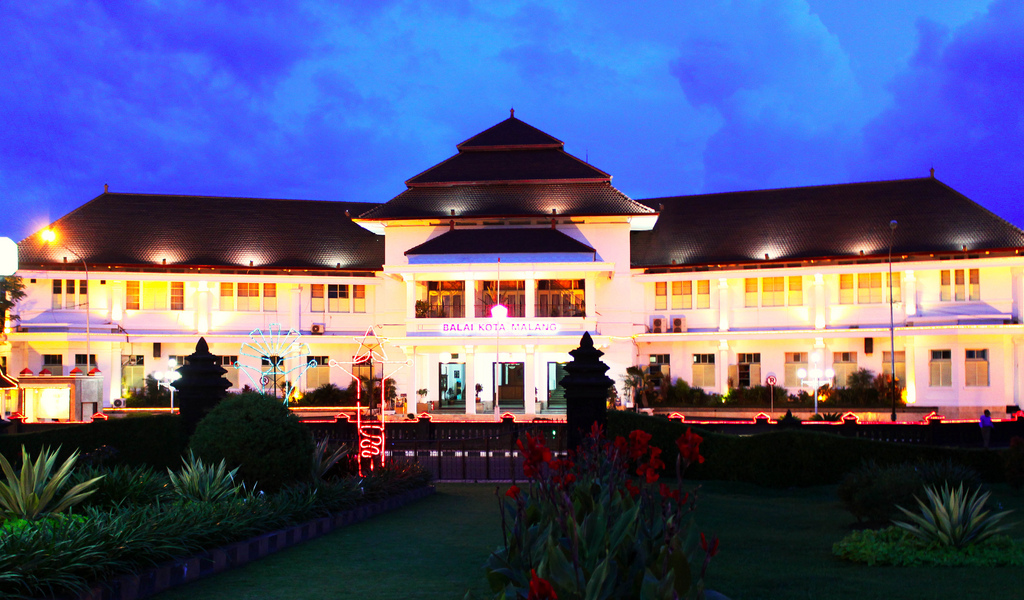
- Malang City Hall located in Klojen

- Map of Malang with Klojen highlighted
- Coordinates: 7.976408°S 112.629378°E
- Country: Indonesia
- Province: East Java
- City: Malang

Area
  - Total: 8.83 km^{2} (3.41 sq mi)
- Elevation: 454 m (1,490 ft)

Population (2010)
  - Total: 105,907
  - Density: 12,000/km^{2} (31,100/sq mi)
- Website: kecklojen.malangkota.go.id

Klojen is a district in city of Malang, East Java, Indonesia.

== Subdistricts ==
- Klojen (subdistrict), postal code 65111
- Rampal Celaket, postal code 65111
- Oro-Oro Dowo, postal code 65112
- Samaan, postal code 65112
- Penanggungan, postal code 65113
- Gadingkasri, postal code 65115
- Bareng, postal code 65116
- Kasin, postal code 65117
- Sukoharjo, postal code 65118
- Kauman, postal code 65119
- Kiduldalem, postal code 65119

== Geography ==
Northern side of Klojen bordering with Lowokwaru and Blimbing subdistricts, eastern side bordering with Kedungkandang subdistrict, southern side bordering with Sukun subdistrict, and western side of Klojen bordering with the Sukun and Lowokwaru sub-districts.

=== Climate ===
The climate in Klojen features tropical monsoon climate (Am) according to Köppen–Geiger climate classification system, as the climate precipitation throughout the year is greatly influenced by the monsoon, bordering with subtropical highland climate (Cwb). Most months of the year are marked by significant rainfall. The short dry season has little impact. The average temperature in Klojen is 23.7 °C. In a year, the average rainfall is 2090 mm.

Climate data for Klojen, Malang (elevation 454 m or 1,490 ft)
Month	Jan	Feb	Mar	Apr	May	Jun	Jul	Aug	Sep	Oct	Nov	Dec	Year
Mean daily maximum °C (°F)	28.5 (83.3)	28.5 (83.3)	28.5 (83.3)	28.6 (83.5)	29 (84)	28.8 (83.8)	28.4 (83.1)	29.3 (84.7)	29.8 (85.6)	30.2 (86.4)	29.5 (85.1)	28.5 (83.3)	29.0 (84.1)
Daily mean °C (°F)	24.1 (75.4)	24.1 (75.4)	24 (75)	23.9 (75.0)	23.9 (75.0)	23.2 (73.8)	22.4 (72.3)	23.2 (73.8)	23.6 (74.5)	24.3 (75.7)	24.3 (75.7)	23.8 (74.8)	23.7 (74.7)
Mean daily minimum °C (°F)	19.7 (67.5)	19.7 (67.5)	19.5 (67.1)	19.3 (66.7)	18.9 (66.0)	17.7 (63.9)	16.5 (61.7)	17.1 (62.8)	17.5 (63.5)	18.5 (65.3)	19.2 (66.6)	19.1 (66.4)	18.6 (65.4)
Average precipitation mm (inches)	335 (13.2)	310 (12.2)	293 (11.5)	173 (6.8)	132 (5.2)	76 (3.0)	46 (1.8)	26 (1.0)	44 (1.7)	105 (4.1)	224 (8.8)	326 (12.8)	2,090 (82.1)
Average relative humidity (%)	81.7	82.3	82.2	79.2	79.8	77.3	75.1	72.9	70.9	70.9	74.4	79.1	77.1
Source 1: Climate-Data.org (temp & precip)
Source 2: Weatherbase (humidity)

== See also ==
- Districts of East Java
- List of districts of Indonesia
