= Ma Chung University =

University in Malang, Indonesia

Coordinates: 7°57′26.6″S 112°35′22.3″E

- Universitas Ma Chung 瑪中大學
- Type: Private University
- Established: 7 July 2007
- Rector: Dr. Ir. Stefanus Yufra Menahen Taneo, MS., M.Sc.
- Location: Malang, East Java, Indonesia
- Colors: Pantone blue
- Website: machung.ac.id

Ma Chung University
- Traditional Chinese: 瑪中大學
- Simplified Chinese: 玛中大学
Transcriptions
Standard Mandarin
- Hanyu Pinyin: Mǎ Zhōng Dà Xué
- Bopomofo: ㄇㄚ˙ㄓㄨㄥ˙ㄉㄚㄒㄩㄝ˙
- Wade–Giles: Ma Chung Ta Hsüeh
Yue: Cantonese
- Jyutping: Maa5 Zung1 Daai6 Hok6
Southern Min
- Hokkien POJ: Má Tiong Tāi-ha̍k

Ma Chung University (traditional Chinese: 瑪中大學; simplified Chinese: 玛中大学; pinyin: Mǎ Zhōng Dà Xué; Wade–Giles: Ma Chung Ta Hsüeh; lit. 'Ma Chung University') is private university in Indonesia, located at Villa Puncak Tidar N-01, City of Malang, East Java. The university is owned by Harapan Bangsa Sejahtera Foundation.

== History ==
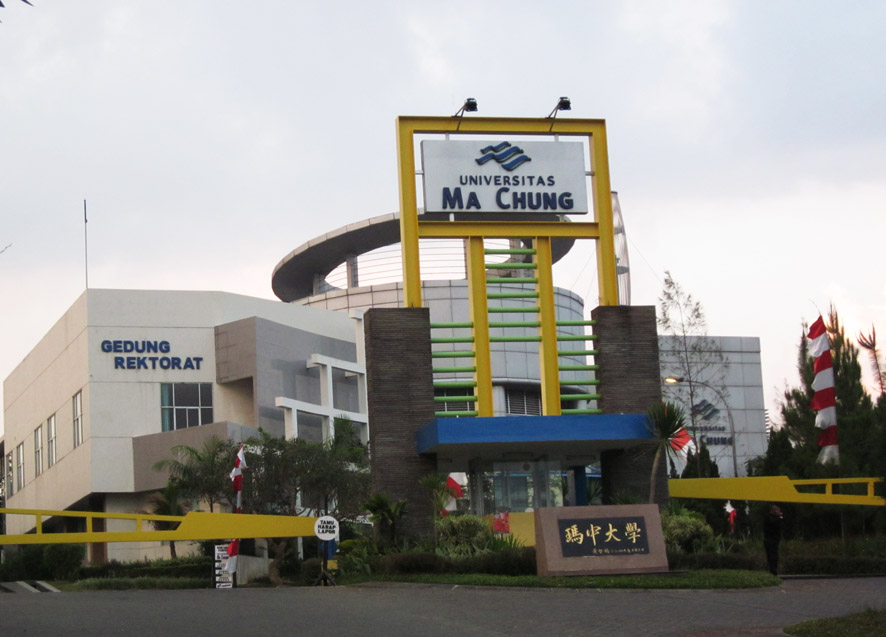
Main building of Ma Chung University.

The name of Ma Chung comes from former Peranakan Chinese-owned high school at Malang in 1950s. The initial idea of establishing Ma Chung University was sparked during the Grand Reunion in commemoration of the 55th anniversary of Ma Chung high school in September 2001 at Xiamen, China. Based on "when you drink water, think of its source, to not forget one's roots or heritage" (飲水思源) traditional chinese proverb, on 1 May 2004, the Ma Chung College was established as the initial step in the establishment of Ma Chung University, which was founded by Mochtar Riady, a Chinese-Indonesian billionaire, and other fourteen notable Ma Chung High School alumni (Soegeng Hendarto, Teguh Kinarto, Hendro Sunjoto, Koentjoro Loekito, Effendy Sudargo, Agus Chandra, Hadi Widjojo, Nuryati Tanuwidjaya, Nehemja, Alex Lesmana Samudra, Evelyn Adam, Usman Harsono, Nagawidjaja Winoto, and Soebroto Wirotomo):

At the Grand Reunion in commemoration of the 60th Anniversary of Ma Chung High School in Malang, 17 July 2005, laid the first stone in the construction of Ma Chung University and the Harapan Bangsa Sejahtera Foundation was formed which houses Ma Chung University. Senior alumni namely Prof. Dr. Yang Zhiling and Prof. Dr. Bin Ling gave many proposals regarding the development and management of the university. His proposal was then used as the first stepping stone for planning (blue print) by the leaders of Ma Chung University. On 7 July 2007, attended by thousands of school alumni, Ma Chung University was officially opened.

Four years later, on September 17, 2011, the University inaugurated its first Professor, Patrisius Istiarto Djiwandono as a Professor in Learning and Research Methodology.

== Faculties and Departments ==
=== Faculty of Economics and Business ===
- Department of International Business Management
- Department of Business Accounting
- Department of Innovation Management

=== Faculty of Technology and Design ===
- Department of Business Information System
- Department of Informatics Engineering
- Department of Visual Communication Design
- Department of Industrial Engineering

=== Faculty of Health Sciences ===
- Department of Pharmacy
- Department of Optometry

=== Faculty of Language ===
- Department of English Literature
- Department of Mandarin Chinese Business Language and Culture

== Student activities ==
These are executing units for extracurricular activities university-wide. These activity units are divided based on their characters/fields:

=== Students' Representative Council ===
- BPMU (University Students' Representative Council/Badan Perwakilan Mahasiswa Universitas)
- BEMU (University Students' Executive Council/Badan Eksekutif Mahasiswa Universitas)
- BPMF (Faculty Students' Representative Council/Badan Perwakilan Mahasiswa Fakultas)
- HMP (Majoring Students Association/Himpunan Mahasiswa Program Studi)

=== Sports interest ===
- Badminton
- Basketball
- Chess
- Futsal
- Wushu
- Pencak Silat
- Swimming
- Volleyball

=== Art interest ===
- Band
- Choir
- Dance
- Karawitan
- Visual Arts
- Chinese Culture
- Cooking

=== Student welfare interest ===
- KOPMA (Student Cooperative)
- Capital Market Study Group
- Rotaract
- Lions Clubs International

== Partnership ==
On July 7, 2014, Ma Chung University signed partnership with Taiwan investors, to fund department of business information technology research and development (with Malang Digital Core community).

== Rectors ==
Number	Name	Term of office
1	Leenawaty Limantara, Ph.D	2006 - 2015
2	Dr. Chatief Kunjaya, M.Sc	2015 - 2019
3	Dr. Murphin Joshua Sembiring, M.Si	2019 - 2023
4	Dr. Ir. Stefanus Yufra Menahen Taneo, MS., M.Sc.	2023 - now
