= Wendit =

Coordinates: 7°57′S 112°40′E

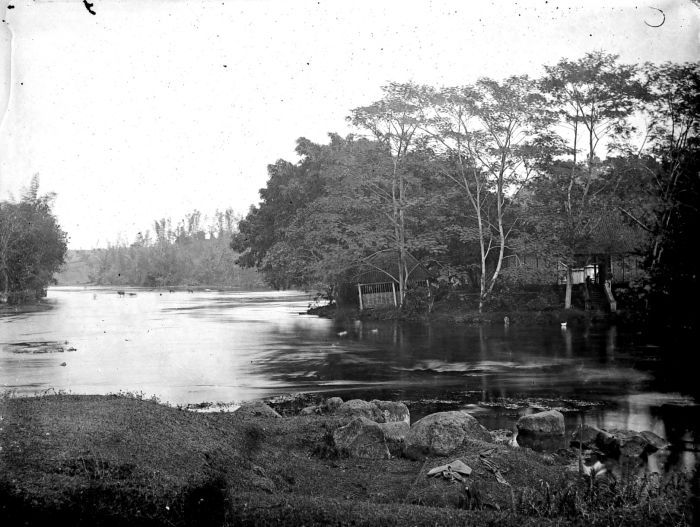
Along the river in Wendit, East Java

Wendit is a populated place in East Java, Indonesia. It is located at -7.9525 North, 112.674 East.
