= Mayor of Malang =

- Wali Kota Malang
- Coat of arms of Malang

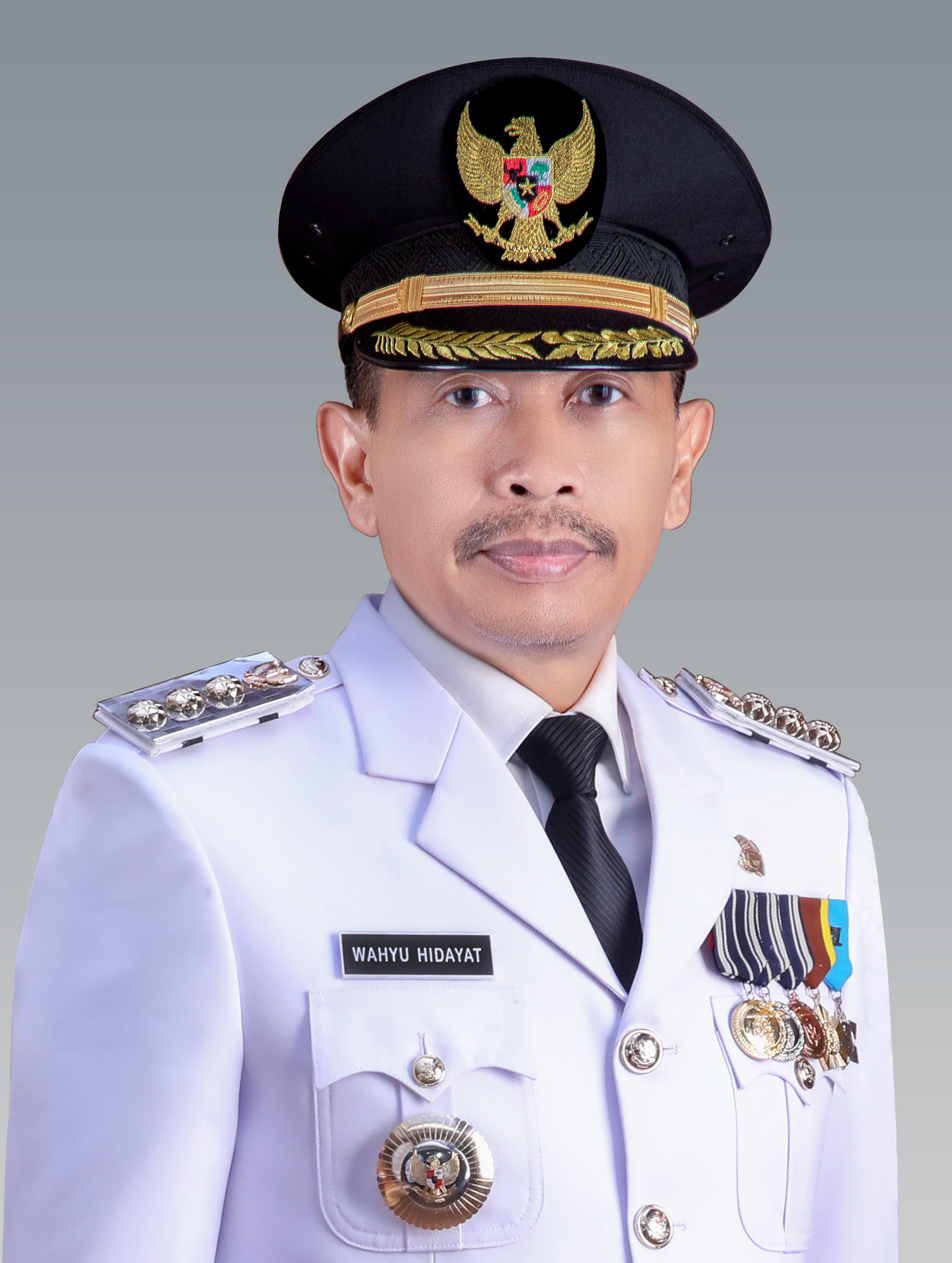
- Incumbent; Wahyu Hidayat since 20 February 2025
- Term length: 5 years
- Inaugural holder: H.I. Bussemaker
- Formation: 1 April 1914
- Website: www.malangkota.go.id

Mayor of Malang is the head of the second-level region who holds the government in Malang together with the Vice Mayor and 45 members of the Malang City Regional House of Representatives. The mayor and vice mayor of Malang are elected through general elections held every 5 years. The first mayor of Malang was H.I. Bussemaker, who governed the city during the Dutch colonisation period from 1914 to 1918.

== List ==
The following is a list of Mayors of Malang from time to time.

Num.	Photo	Mayor	Beginning of office	End of term	Period	Vice	Note
Burgemeester van Malang
1		F. L. Broekveldt	1914	1918			(Note: Assistant resident of the Malang department who also serves as Mayor of the municipality of Malang)
2		J. J. Coert	1918	1919			
3		H. I. Bussemaker	1 Juli 1919	1924	1		
3		H. I. Bussemaker	1924	1929	2		
4		Ir. Voorneman	1929	1933	3		
5		Ir. Lakemar	1933	1936	4		
6		J. H. Boerstra	1936	8 March 1942	5		
マラン市長
7		Raden Adipati Ario Sam	1942	1945	6		
7		Mr. Soewarso Tirtowijogo	1942	1945	6		
Mayor of Malang
1		M. Sardjono Wiryohardjono	1945	1958	7		
2		Koesno Soeroatmodjo	1958	1966	8		
3		Kol. M. Ng Soedarto	1966	1968	9		
4		Kol. R. Indra Soedarmadji	1968	1973	10		
5		Kol. Soegiyono	19 June 1973	1983	11		
5		Kol. Soegiyono	19 June 1973	1983	12		
6		Drs. Soeprapto	1983	1983	13		
7		dr. H. Tom Uripan N SH	1983	1988	13		
8		H. M. Soesamto	1988	1998	14		
8		H. M. Soesamto	1988	1998	15		
9		Kol. Inf. H Suyitno	1998	2003	16	Drs. H. Soetrisno M. M	
10		Drs. Peni Suparto; M.AP	13 September 2003	13 September 2008	17	Bambang Priyo Utomo	
10		Drs. Peni Suparto; M.AP	13 September 2008	13 September 2013	18 (2008)	Bambang Priyo Utomo	
11		Ir. H. Mochammad Anton	13 September 2013	15 February 2018	19 (2013)	Sutiaji	
12		Drs. H. Sutiaji	24 September 2018	24 September 2023	20 (2018)	Sofyan Edi Jarwoko	
13		Dr. Ir. H. Wahyu Hidayat; M.M.	20 February 2025	Incumbent	21 (2024)	Ali Muthohirin	

Note

Non-Partisan/Government Assignment
ABRI
Indonesian Democratic Party of Struggle
Great Indonesia Movement Party
National Awakening Party
Democratic Party

== Temporary replacement for Mayor ==
The following is a list of temporary replacements for the position of Mayor of Malang.

Portrait	Official	Taking office	End of term	Period	Note	Definitive Mayor
	Wahid Wahyudi (Temporary Acting)	15 February 2018	23 June 2018	18 (2013)		Mochammad Anton
	Sutiaji (Acting Officer)	23 June 2018	13 September 2018	18 (2013)		Mochammad Anton
	Wasto (Daily Executive)	13 September 2018	24 September 2018	—		Transition (2018)
	Dr. Ir. Wahyu Hidayat; M.M. (Acting)	24 September 2023	10 August 2024	—		Transition (2023–2025)
	Iwan Kurniawan; S.T., M.M. (Acting)	10 August 2024	20 February 2025	—		Transition (2023–2025)

== See also ==
- Malang
- List of incumbent regional heads and deputy regional heads in East Java
