= 2024 Malang mayoral election =

- 27 November 2024
- Turnout: 64.82%
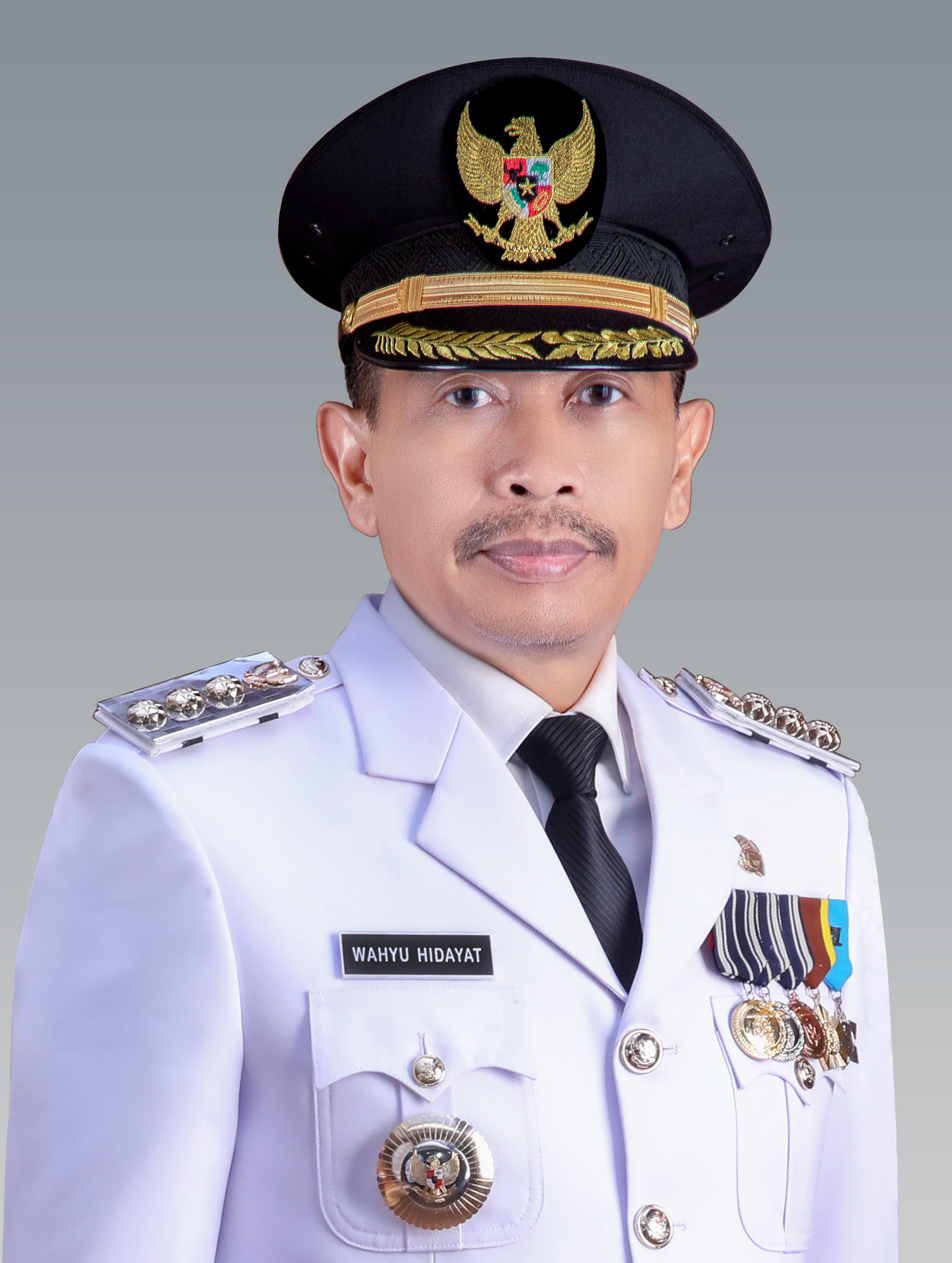

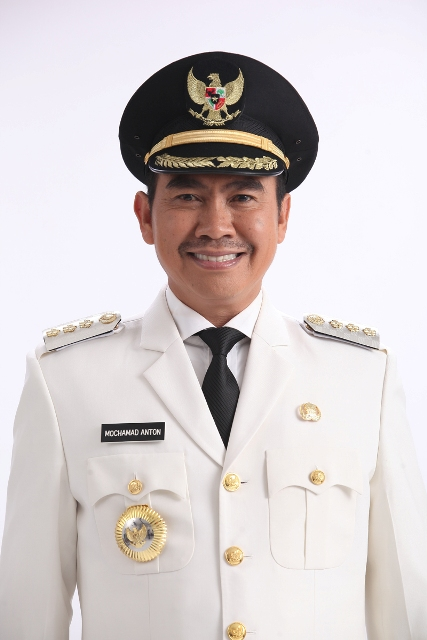

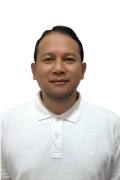
Candidate	Wahyu Hidayat	Mochammad Anton	Heri Cahyono
Party	Gerindra	PKB	PDI-P
Alliance	KIM Plus
Running mate	Ali Muthohirin	Dimyati Ayatulloh	Ganisa Pratiwi Rumpoko
popular vote	203,257	132,258	74,147
Percentage	49.62%	32.28%	18.10%
- Results by district and subdistrict (Interactive map)
Mayor before election
Iwan Kurniawan (acting)
Independent
Elected mayor
Wahyu Hidayat
Gerindra

A mayoral election was held in Malang, East Java on 27 November 2024 to elect the mayor and vice mayor for a five-year term. They were held as part of local elections across Indonesia. The previous election was held in 2018. Wahyu Hidayat of the Gerindra Party was elected mayor, with Ali Muthohirin becoming his vice mayor.

== Electoral system ==
The election, like other local elections in 2024, follow the first-past-the-post system where the candidate with the most votes wins the election, even if they do not win a majority. It is possible for a candidate to run uncontested, in which case the candidate is still required to win a majority of votes "against" an "empty box" option. Should the candidate fail to do so, the election will be repeated on a later date.

== Candidates ==
According to electoral regulations, in order to qualify for the election, candidates were required to secure support from a political party or a coalition of parties controlling 9 seats (20 percent of all seats) in the Malang City Regional House of Representatives (DPRD). The Indonesian Democratic Party of Struggle, which won 9 seats in the 2024 legislative election, is the only party eligible to nominate a mayoral candidate without forming a coalition with other parties. Candidates may alternatively demonstrate support to run as an independent in form of photocopies of identity cards, which in Malang's case corresponds to 48,882 copies. Two independent candidates registered with the General Elections Commission (KPU), and one was disqualified after failing to submit sufficient proofs of support. The other candidate, Heri Cahyono, submitted the required documents and his candidacy is pending KPU verification.

=== Potential ===
The following are individuals who have either been publicly mentioned as a potential candidate by a political party in the DPRD, publicly declared their candidacy with press coverage, or considered as a potential candidate by media outlets:

- Sutiaji (Demokrat), previous mayor (2018–2023).
- Mochammad Anton, former mayor of Malang (2013–2018).
- Dewanti Rumpoko (PDI-P), former mayor of Batu (2017–2022).
- Sofyan Edi Jarwoko (Golkar), previous vice mayor.
- Moreno Soeprapto (Gerindra), member of the House of Representatives, chairman of Gerindra's Malang City branch.
- Heri Cahyono (Independent), businessman.

== Political map ==
Following the 2024 Indonesian legislative election, nine political parties are represented in the Malang City DPRD:

Political parties	Seat count
Indonesian Democratic Party of Struggle (PDI-P)	9 / 45
National Awakening Party (PKB)	8 / 45
Prosperous Justice Party (PKS)	7 / 45
Party of Functional Groups (Golkar)	6 / 45
Great Indonesia Movement Party (Gerindra)	6 / 45
Democratic Party (Demokrat)	3 / 45
NasDem Party	3 / 45
Indonesian Solidarity Party (PSI)	2 / 45
National Mandate Party (PAN)	1 / 45

== Results ==

Candidate	Running mate	Party	Votes	%
Wahyu Hidayat	Ali Muthohirin	Gerindra Party	203,257	49.62
Mochammad Anton	Dimyati Ayatulloh	National Awakening Party	132,258	32.28
Heri Cahyono	Ganisa Pratiwi Rumpoko	Indonesian Democratic Party of Struggle	74,147	18.10
Total			409,662	100.00
Valid votes			409,662	95.64
Invalid/blank votes			18,661	4.36
Total votes			428,323	100.00
Registered voters/turnout			660,774	64.82
Source: General Elections Commission
