= Kedungkandang =

- District
- Kecamatan Kedungkandang
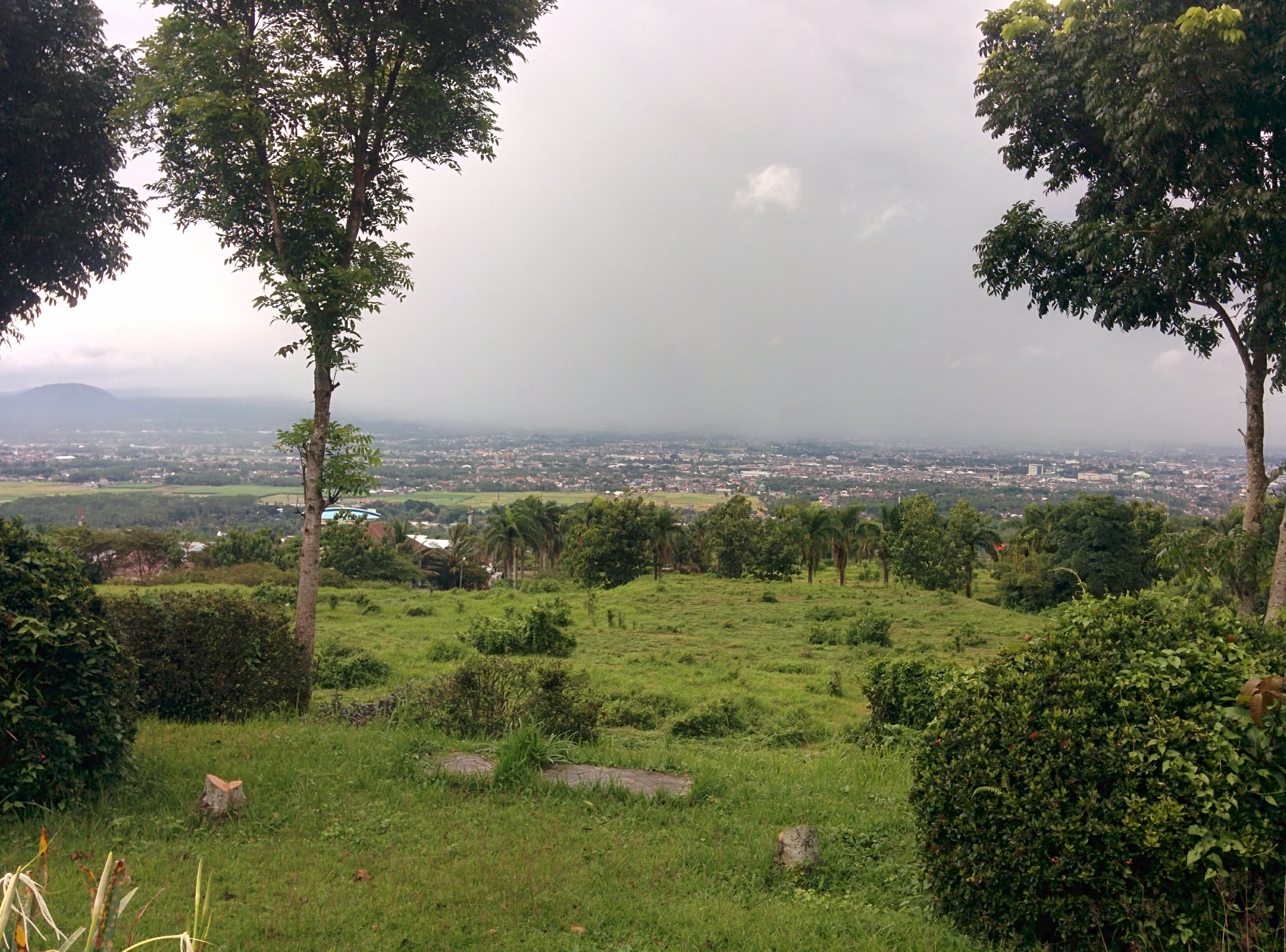
- View of Kedungkandang from Buring hills

- Map of Malang with Kedungkandang highlighted
- Coordinates: 8.011917°S 112.644189°E
- Country: Indonesia
- Province: East Java
- City: Malang

Area
  - Total: 39.89 km^{2} (15.40 sq mi)
- Elevation: 464 m (1,522 ft)

Population (2018)
  - Total: 192,445
  - Density: 4,824/km^{2} (12,500/sq mi)
- Website: keckedungkandang.malangkota.go.id

Kedungkandang is the easternmost district (kecamatan) in Malang City, East Java, Indonesia. Almost half of this area is dominated by paddy fields and other agricultural lands. Malang old town (kotalama) also located in Kedungkandang.

== Subdistricts ==
There are 12 subdistricts (kelurahan) in Kedungkandang:

- Mergosono, postal code 65134
- Bumiayu, postal code 65135
- Wonokoyo, postal code 65135
- Buring, postal code 65136
- Lesanpuro, postal code 65138
- Madyopuro, postal code 65138
- Sawojajar, postal code 65139
- Arjowinangun, postal code 65132
- Cemorokandang, postal code 65138
- Kedungkandang, postal code 65137
- Tlogowaru, postal code 65133
- Kotalama, postal code 65136 (Kotalama in English means old town, because the history of early Malang settlements located in this subdistrict).

== Geography ==
Northern side of Kedungkandang bordering with Blimbing district, eastern and southern side bordering with Malang Regency, and western side of Kedungkandang bordering with the Sukun and Lowokwaru districts.

=== Climate ===
The climate in Kedungkandang features tropical monsoon climate (Am) according to Köppen–Geiger climate classification system, as the climate precipitation throughout the year is greatly influenced by the monsoon, bordering with subtropical highland climate (Cwb). Most months of the year are marked by significant rainfall. The region's short dry season has little impact. The average temperature in Kedungkandang is 23.7 °C. In a year, the average rainfall is 2153 mm.

Climate data for Kedungkandang, Malang (elevation 464 m or 1,522 ft)
Month	Jan	Feb	Mar	Apr	May	Jun	Jul	Aug	Sep	Oct	Nov	Dec	Year
Mean daily maximum °C (°F)	28.5 (83.3)	28.5 (83.3)	28.5 (83.3)	28.7 (83.7)	29 (84)	28.8 (83.8)	28.3 (82.9)	29.2 (84.6)	29.8 (85.6)	30.3 (86.5)	29.5 (85.1)	28.4 (83.1)	29.0 (84.1)
Daily mean °C (°F)	24.1 (75.4)	24.1 (75.4)	23.9 (75.0)	24 (75)	23.9 (75.0)	23.2 (73.8)	22.3 (72.1)	23 (73)	23.6 (74.5)	24.4 (75.9)	24.3 (75.7)	23.7 (74.7)	23.7 (74.6)
Mean daily minimum °C (°F)	19.7 (67.5)	19.7 (67.5)	19.4 (66.9)	19.3 (66.7)	18.9 (66.0)	17.7 (63.9)	16.4 (61.5)	16.9 (62.4)	17.4 (63.3)	18.5 (65.3)	19.1 (66.4)	19 (66)	18.5 (65.3)
Average precipitation mm (inches)	340 (13.4)	307 (12.1)	301 (11.9)	179 (7.0)	141 (5.6)	81 (3.2)	52 (2.0)	26 (1.0)	48 (1.9)	110 (4.3)	234 (9.2)	334 (13.1)	2,153 (84.7)
Average relative humidity (%)	81.7	82.3	82.2	79.2	79.8	77.3	75.1	72.9	70.9	70.9	74.4	79.1	77.1
Source 1: Climate-Data.org (temp & precip)
Source 2: Weatherbase (humidity)

== See also ==
- Districts of East Java
- List of districts of Indonesia
