= Peni Suparto =

Indonesian politician

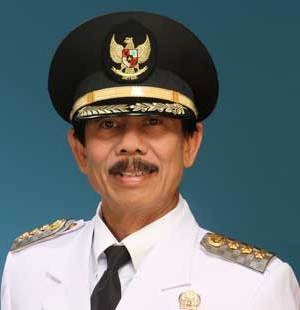

10th Mayor of Malang
- In office 2003–2013
- Preceded by: Suyitno
- Succeeded by: Mochammad Anton

Member of People's Representative Council
- In office 1 October 1999 – 2003
- Succeeded by: Muhammad Iqbal

Personal details
- Born: 14 August 1947 (age 78) Kediri, East Java, Indonesia

Peni Suparto (born 14 August 1947) is an Indonesian politician and educator who served as the mayor of Malang, East Java, between 2003 and 2013.

== Early life and career ==
Peni Suparto was born in Blitar on 14 August 1947, and was educated at a teachers' school. He began working as a teacher at an elementary school in Blitar in 1965. He then studied at the teachers' college (IKIP) in Malang (today State University of Malang) between 1966 and 1970 before returning to Blitar to teach at an economics vocational school until 1974. He then moved to IKIP Malang as an assistant lecturer, becoming a full lecturer in 1980.

== Political career ==
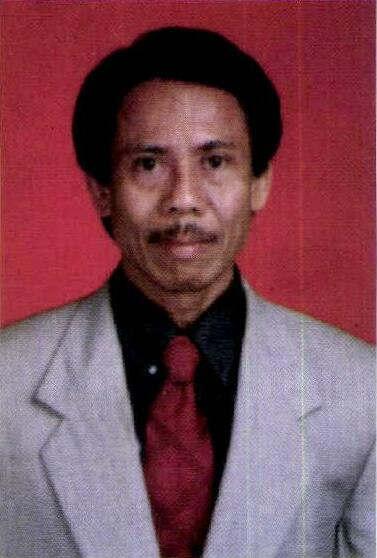
Peni Suparto as a member of the People's Representative Council

Suparto ran as a legislative candidate in the 1999 legislative election and was elected to the People's Representative Council. In 2003, he ran as mayor of Malang. Suparto was then the chairman of PDI-P's local branch in Malang, and he ran with Golkar's local chairman Bambang Priyo Utomo as running mate. The ticket was elected on 28 October 2003 by Malang's city council. Early in his first term, he clashed with the city council over the issue of revisions to the local budget. He would later be reelected in the 2008 mayoral election after winning in a five candidate race, retaining Utomo as his deputy. He directly led a protest against a hike in fuel prices in front of Malang's city hall in 2012, and received a reprimand from governor Soekarwo as a result. He also initiated the construction of the Kedungkandang Flyover in the city's east, although the project stalled during the rest of his tenure, only being opened in 2020.

In 2013, with his term expiring, his wife Heri Pudji Utami ran for mayor, but was defeated in the election with Mochammad Anton instead being elected. Prior to the election, he had been removed from his post as party branch chairman due to his refusal to endorse the party's candidates for the mayoral election.

After his tenure as mayor, Suparto worked to promote tourism in the city. He also publicly spoke out against a 2022 proposal to brand Malang as a "halal city".
