= Sutiaji =

Indonesian politician

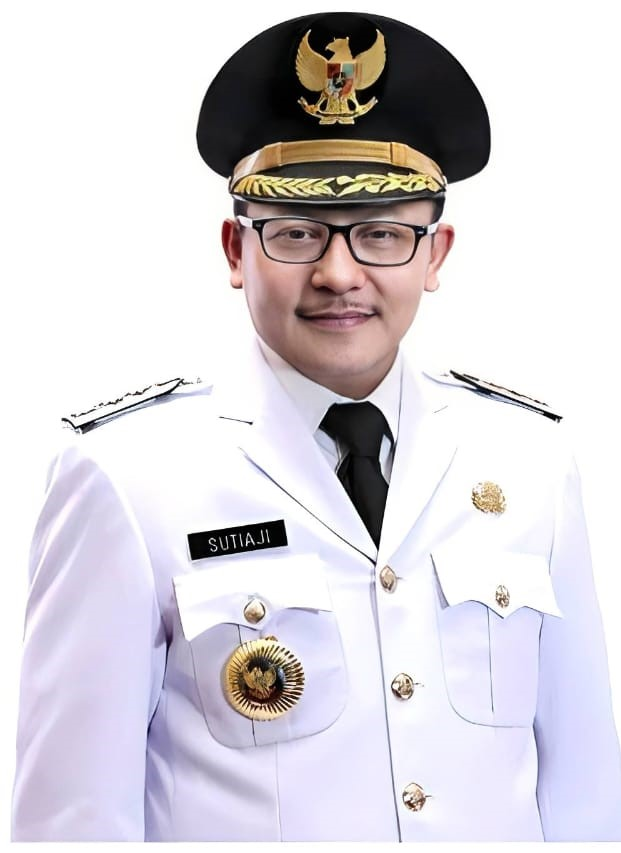

12th Mayor of Malang
- In office 24 September 2018 – 24 September 2023
- Deputy: Sofyan Edi Jarwoko
- Preceded by: Mochammad Anton
- Succeeded by: Wahyu Hidayat

Deputy Mayor of Malang
- In office 13 September 2013 – 2018

Member of Malang City DPRD
- In office 31 August 2009 – 13 September 2013

Personal details
- Born: 13 May 1964 (age 62) Lamongan, East Java
- Party: Demokrat
- Education: UIN Maliki

Sutiaji (born 13 May 1964) is an Indonesian politician who served as the mayor of Malang, East Java between 2018 and 2023. Previously, he was a member of the city's legislative council and later deputy mayor of the city between 2013 and 2018, and briefly served as acting mayor in 2018 until his official inauguration as mayor.

== Early life ==
Sutiaji was born in Lamongan on 13 May 1964, and he received his first nine years of education in madrasa there. He then entered the Bahrul Ulum pesantren in Jombang, before studying Tarbiyah (education) at Maulana Malik Ibrahim State Islamic University Malang.

== Career ==
Sutiaji was first elected into the Malang city council in 2009, and was sworn in on 31 August 2009. In the city council, Sutiaji was secretary of the National Awakening Party faction. During this time, he was also active in the city's Nahdlatul Ulama organization, and by 2011 he was deputy chairman of its Malang branch.

He later participated in the city's mayoral election in 2013 as the running mate of Mochammad Anton, winning with 47.33% of the votes. The pair was sworn in as Deputy Mayor on 13 September 2013.

In 2018, he once more participated in the city's mayoral election, this time as a mayoral candidate. In order to do this, he signed up and became a member of Demokrat. The other two candidates, including the incumbent Anton, were under custody of the Corruption Eradication Commission (KPK) and Sutiaji won with 44.5% of the votes.

Due to the incumbent being arrested, Sutiaji became acting mayor once he returned from his electoral leave starting from 23 June 2018. During this period, he was examined by KPK as a witness related to bribery in the 2015 city budget, which involved many members of the city council. He was sworn in as mayor on 24 September 2018.

After being sworn in, in December 2018 he issued an internal memo to city officials prohibiting businesses from forcing employees to wear Christmas-themed clothing and for Christmas festivities to be monitored so to not be "annoying". His term expired on 24 September 2023, and he was replaced by Wahyu Hidayat as acting mayor.
