= Teguh =

Teguh is a surname. Notable people with the surname include:

- Komang Teguh (born 2002), Indonesian footballer
- Mario Teguh (born 1956), Indonesian businessman
