= Lowokwaru =

- District
- Kecamatan Lowokwaru
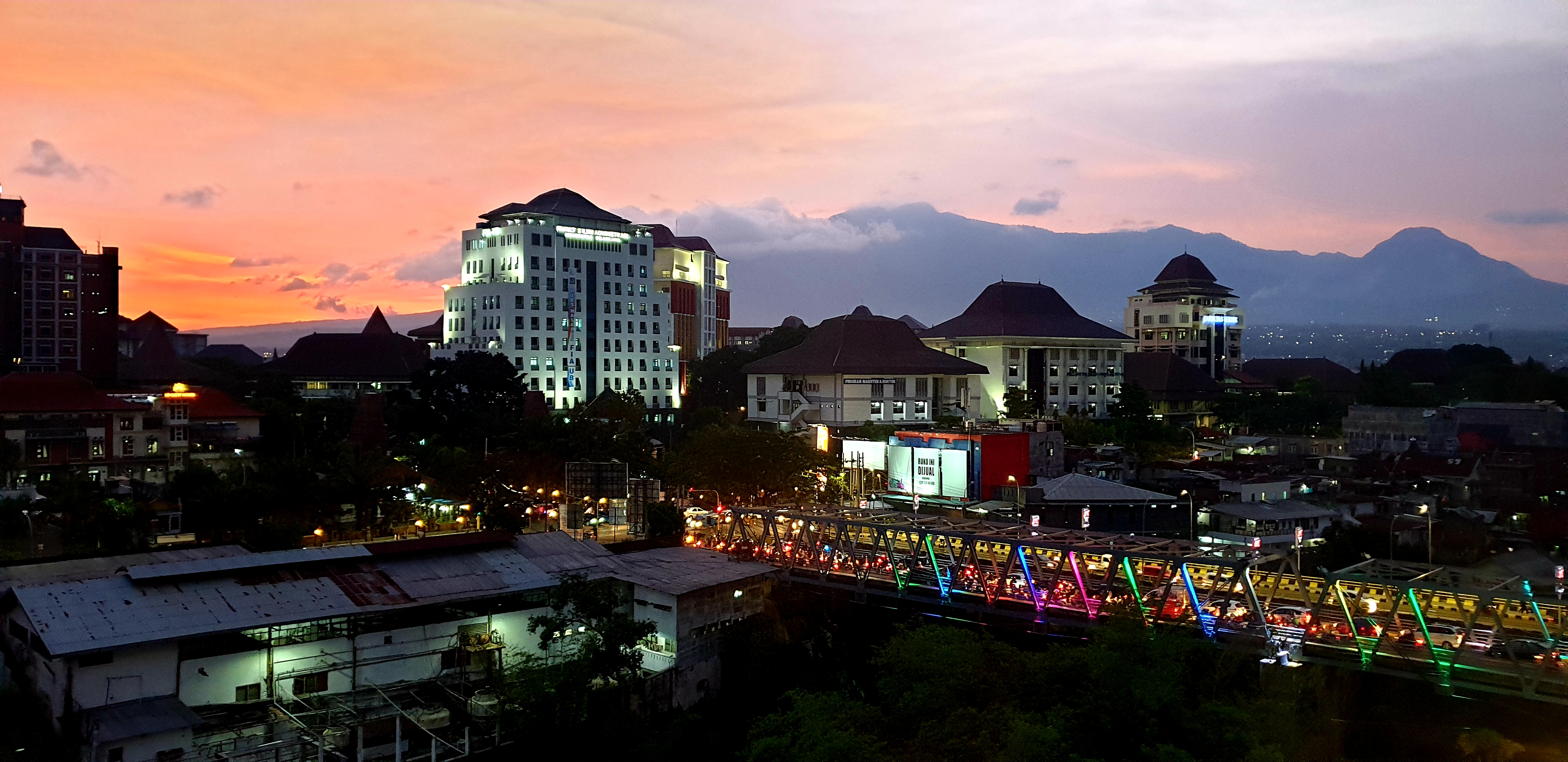
- Northern side of Brawijaya University view in Lowokwaru and far view of Mount Kawi-Butak

- Map of Malang with Lowokwaru highlighted
- Coordinates: 7.944518°S 112.619456°E
- Country: Indonesia
- Province: East Java
- City: Malang

Area
  - Total: 20.89 km^{2} (8.07 sq mi)
- Elevation: 459 m (1,506 ft)

Population (2010)
  - Total: 186,013
  - Density: 8,904/km^{2} (23,060/sq mi)
- Website: keclowokwaru.malangkota.go.id

Lowokwaru is a district (kecamatan) in Malang, East Java, Indonesia. Lowokwaru is the home of notable universities and colleges in Malang.

== History ==
Before 1988, Lowokwaru was just urban villages (kelurahan) and part of Blimbing. In April 1988, the city government of Malang divided from former western side of Blimbing and create Lowokwaru into 12 urban villages.

== Urban villages ==
There are 12 urban villages (kelurahan) in Lowokwaru:

- Jatimulyo, postal code 65141
- Lowokwaru, postal code 65141
- Tulusrejo, postal code 65141
- Mojolangu, postal code 65142
- Tunjungsekar, postal code 65142
- Tasikmadu, postal code 65143
- Tunggulwulung, postal code 65143
- Dinoyo, postal code 65144
- Merjosari, postal code 65144
- Tlogomas, postal code 65144
- Sumbersari, postal code 65145
- Ketawanggede, postal code 65145

== Geography ==
=== Climate ===
The climate in Lowokwaru features tropical monsoon climate (Am) according to Köppen–Geiger climate classification system, as the climate precipitation throughout the year is greatly influenced by the monsoon, bordering with subtropical highland climate (Cwb). Most months of the year are marked by significant rainfall. The short dry season has little impact. The average temperature in Lowokwaru is 23.8 °C. In a year, the average rainfall is 2101 mm.

Climate data for Lowokwaru, Malang (elevation 459 m or 1,506 ft)
| Month | Jan | Feb | Mar | Apr | May | Jun | Jul | Aug | Sep | Oct | Nov | Dec | Year |
|---|---|---|---|---|---|---|---|---|---|---|---|---|---|
| Mean daily maximum °C (°F) | 28.5 (83.3) | 28.5 (83.3) | 28.5 (83.3) | 28.7 (83.7) | 29 (84) | 28.8 (83.8) | 28.4 (83.1) | 29.3 (84.7) | 29.8 (85.6) | 30.4 (86.7) | 29.5 (85.1) | 28.5 (83.3) | 29.0 (84.2) |
| Daily mean °C (°F) | 24.1 (75.4) | 24.1 (75.4) | 24 (75) | 24 (75) | 23.9 (75.0) | 23.2 (73.8) | 22.5 (72.5) | 23.2 (73.8) | 23.6 (74.5) | 24.5 (76.1) | 24.3 (75.7) | 23.7 (74.7) | 23.8 (74.7) |
| Mean daily minimum °C (°F) | 19.7 (67.5) | 19.7 (67.5) | 19.5 (67.1) | 19.3 (66.7) | 18.9 (66.0) | 17.7 (63.9) | 16.6 (61.9) | 17.1 (62.8) | 17.5 (63.5) | 18.6 (65.5) | 19.2 (66.6) | 19 (66) | 18.6 (65.4) |
| Average precipitation mm (inches) | 337 (13.3) | 313 (12.3) | 295 (11.6) | 174 (6.9) | 132 (5.2) | 76 (3.0) | 46 (1.8) | 26 (1.0) | 46 (1.8) | 106 (4.2) | 224 (8.8) | 326 (12.8) | 2,101 (82.7) |
| Average relative humidity (%) | 81.7 | 82.3 | 82.2 | 79.2 | 79.8 | 77.3 | 75.1 | 72.9 | 70.9 | 70.9 | 74.4 | 79.1 | 77.1 |
Source 1: Climate-Data.org (temp & precip)
Source 2: Weatherbase (humidity)

== See also ==
- Districts of East Java
- List of districts of Indonesia
