= Ali Muthohirin =

Indonesian politician (born 1986)

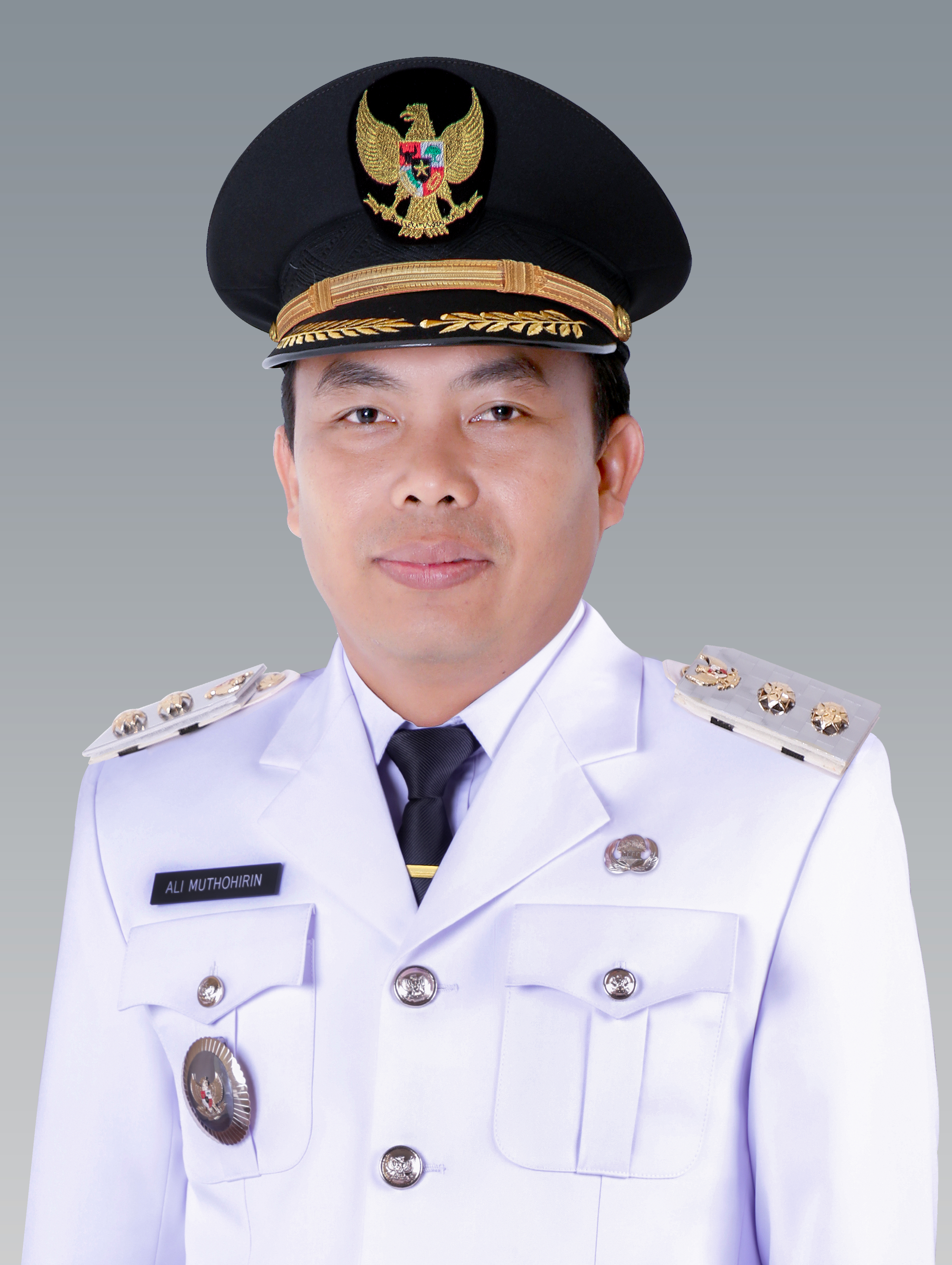

4th Vice mayor of Malang
- Incumbent
- Assumed office 20 February 2025
- President: Prabowo Subianto
- Governor: Khofifah Indar Parawansa
- Mayor: Wahyu Hidayat
- Preceded by: Sofyan Edi Jarwoko

Personal details
- Born: September 14, 1986 (age 40) Gresik, East Java
- Party: Indonesian Solidarity Party (2023–now)
- Spouse: Saila El Azkiya
- Children: 3
- Education: Muhammadiyah University of Malang (S.Sy.)
- Profession: Politician, Businessman

Ali Muthohirin (born 14 September 1986) is a politician from the Indonesian Solidarity Party who served as Deputy mayor of Malang for the 2025–2030 term. He served since 20 February 2025 after being inaugurated by President Prabowo Subianto at the Istana Negara, Jakarta.

== Career ==
=== Independent Commissioner of PT Adhi Persada Beton ===
Since 2020, Ali has served as an Independent Commissioner of PT Adhi Persada Beton. This company operates in the precast concrete production sector.

=== Becoming Deputy Mayor of Malang ===
On 29 August 2024, Ali Muthohirin officially registered to participate in the 2024 Malang mayoral election. He accompanied Wahyu Hidayat, who previously served as Acting Mayor of Malang for the 2023–2024 term and was nominated by Gerindra, PSI, PKS, Golkar, NasDem, and supported by 8 non-parliamentary parties. After the vote, the Wahyu Hidayat-Ali Muthohirin pair received the support of 203.257 votes or 49,62 percent of the total valid votes. They were then appointed by the Malang City KPU as the elected mayor and deputy mayor on Thursday, 6 February 2025.

Political offices
Preceded by Sofyan Edi Jarwoko	Vice mayor of Malang; 2025–now	Succeeded by Incumbent
