= Maulana Malik Ibrahim State Islamic University Malang =

University in Batu, East Java, Indonesia

Maulana Malik Ibrahim Islamic State University Malang
- Universitas Islam Negeri Maulana Malik Ibrahim Malang
- Motto: أولوا الألباب (People of understanding)
- Type: Public
- Established: 21 March 1997; 29 years ago (as IAIN); 21 June 2004; 21 years ago (as university)
- Rector: Abdul Haris
- Location: Malang, East Java, Indonesia; 7°57′6.4″S 112°36′26.8″E
- Website: uin-malang.ac.id

Maulana Malik Ibrahim Islamic State University Malang (Indonesian: Universitas Islam Negeri Maulana Malik Ibrahim Malang, often UIN Malang or UIN Maliki) is an Islamic public university in Malang, Indonesia. As a state-operated university, it participates in the SNMPTN admissions system.

One of the three state universities and many others in the city, it was originally founded as a branch of the Sunan Ampel State Islamic University Surabaya in 1965. It later separated into its own organization in 1997, and was formally made a university in 2004.

== History ==
In Indonesia, State Islamic Institutes (Institut Agama Islam Negeri, IAIN) trace their origins from Islamic boarding schools known as pesantren. In 1961, the Ministry of Religious Affairs founded branches of IAIN Sunan Kalijaga Yogyakarta in the cities of Surabaya and Malang. The Malang branch acted as the faculty of Tarbiyah (Islamic education). Later on, the three were merged into IAIN Sunan Ampel before the Malang branch separated in 1997, due to a presidential decree mandating the creation of separate Islamic institutes (referred to as Sekolah Tinggi Agama Islam Negeri or STAIN) across the country.

After its 1997 separation, the university was once more renamed to Universitas Islam Indonesia Sudan (Indonesian-Sudanese Islamic University) by vice president Hamzah Haz on 21 July 2002 as a result of a cooperation between Indonesia and Sudan – marking its transition to university status. Two years later, following Presidential Decree No. 50/2004, released on 21 June 2004, the university was renamed to Universitas Negeri Islam Malang (Islamic State University of Malang). The date was assumed by the university as its founding date. The name changes, from IAIN Malang to STAIN Malang to UIIS to UIN Malang, all occurred under a single rector and earned the institute a national record for "Most University Name Changes".

In 2009, Susilo Bambang Yudhoyono once more altered the university's name - this time to Universitas Islam Negeri Maulana Malik Ibrahim Malang, based from Wali Songo member Malik Ibrahim. This further name change was preceded by a massive expansion of university facilities, partly funded by the Islamic Development Bank.

== Students and faculties ==
Compared to Brawijaya University and Malang State University, UIN Maliki takes in the fewest freshmen annually, with 2,500 students in 2014 compared to over 12,000 for Brawijaya and about 7,000 for Malang State. Of the 2,500 figure, 700 originated from SNMPTN while the rest was directly filtered by the university. The university has two campuses, with a third one under construction at the nearby city of Batu as of 2016.

The university has six faculties and a postgraduate study program:

1. Faculty of Tarbiyah and Teaching
2. Faculty of Sharia
3. Faculty of Humanities
4. Faculty of Psychology
5. Faculty of Economics
6. Faculty of Science and Technology
7. Faculty of Medical and the Science of Health

== See also ==
- Indonesia-Sudan relations
- Islam in Indonesia
