= 2018 Malang mayoral election =

Indonesian mayoral election

← 2013	27 June 2018	2024 →
- Turnout: 66.2%
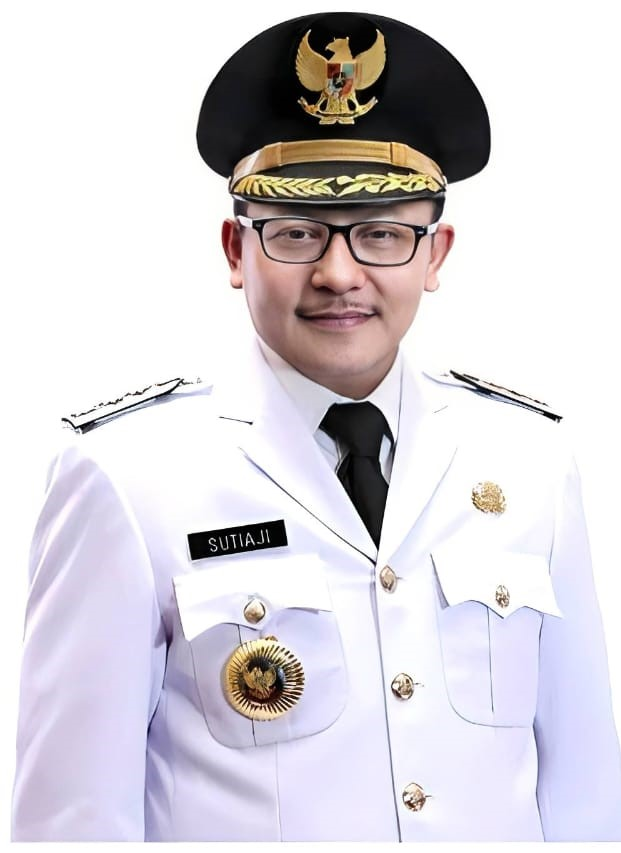

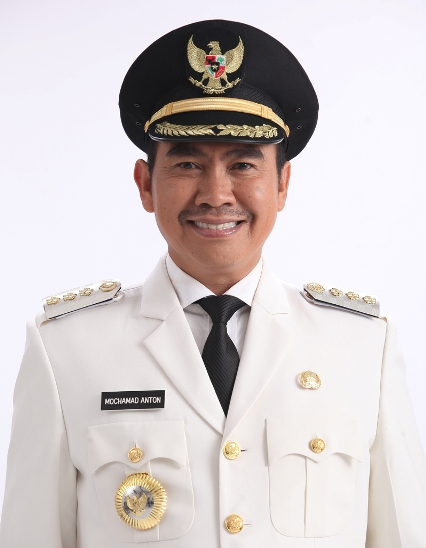

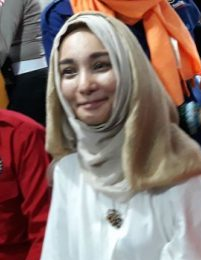
Candidate	Sutiaji	Mochammad Anton	Ya'qud Ananda Gudban
Party	Demokrat	PKB	Hanura
Running mate	Sofyan Edi Jarwoko	Syamsul Mahmud	Ahmad Wanedi
Popular vote	165,194	135,710	69,973
Percentage	44.54%	36.59%	18.87%
Mayor before election
Mochammad Anton
PKB
Elected mayor
Sutiaji
Demokrat

The 2018 Malang mayoral election was held on 27 June 2018 as part of simultaneous local elections to elect the mayor of Malang, East Java for a five-year term. The previous election was held in 2013. Three candidates contested the election including incumbent Mochammad Anton, but due to a corruption case, Anton and another candidate, Ya'qud Ananda Gudban, were arrested by the Corruption Eradication Commission prior to the election date. The unarrested incumbent vice mayor, Sutiaji won the election with 44.5% of votes.

== Electoral system ==
The election, like other local elections in 2018, followed the first-past-the-post system, where the candidate with the most votes wins the election, even if they do not win a majority. It is possible for a candidate to run uncontested, in which case the candidate is still required to win a majority of votes "against" an "empty box" option. Should the candidate fail to do so, the election will be repeated on a later date.

== Candidates ==
According to electoral regulations, in order to qualify for the election, candidates were required to secure support from a political party or a coalition of parties controlling nine seats (20 percent of all seats) in the Malang City Regional House of Representatives (DPRD). Candidates may alternatively demonstrate support to run as an independent in form of photocopies of identity cards, which in Malang's case corresponds to around 46 thousand copies. Three potential candidates consulted with the General Elections Commission (KPU) to run in the election, and one claimed to have collected around 40 thousand copies, but eventually no candidates registered prior to the set deadline on 29 November 2017.

=== Official ===
The following are candidates which took part in the election, with their ballot numbers and supporting parties:

Ballot number	Candidate	Running mate	Endorsing parties	Seat count
1	Ya'qud Ananda Gudban (Hanura)	Ahmad Wanedi (PDI-P)	PDI-P	11 / 45
1	Ya'qud Ananda Gudban (Hanura)	Ahmad Wanedi (PDI-P)	PAN	4 / 45
1	Ya'qud Ananda Gudban (Hanura)	Ahmad Wanedi (PDI-P)	Hanura	3 / 45
1	Ya'qud Ananda Gudban (Hanura)	Ahmad Wanedi (PDI-P)	PPP	3 / 45
2	Mochammad Anton (PKB)	Syamsul Mahmud	PKB	6 / 45
2	Mochammad Anton (PKB)	Syamsul Mahmud	PKS	3 / 45
3	Sutiaji (Demokrat)	Sofyan Edi Jarwoko (Golkar)	Demokrat	5 / 45
3	Sutiaji (Demokrat)	Sofyan Edi Jarwoko (Golkar)	Golkar	5 / 45

Ya'qud Ananda Gudban was a member of the city's DPRD from the People's Conscience Party (Hanura), and chaired Hanura's Malang branch. She had served in the DPRD since 2009. Her running mate, Ahmad Wanedi, is a member of the Indonesian Democratic Party of Struggle (PDI-P). The ticket initially received support by a coalition of five parties – Hanura, PDI-P, PAN, PPP, and Nasdem. As Nasdem's Malang chairman M. Fadli was absent during the registration process, however, their support was not counted. Fadli was later fired from his chairmanship by provincial chairman Rendra Kresna due to the absence.

The incumbent mayor elected in 2013, Mochammad Anton, was the first Chinese Indonesian to serve as mayor of Malang, and was also chairman of the National Awakening Party (PKB) in Malang. His running mate was Syamsul Mahmud, a real estate businessman. The ticket was supported by PKB and PKS. Initially, Nasdem had publicly declared support for Anton before withdrawing it.

Vice mayor Sutiaji ran separately from Anton, and moved to the Democratic Party (Demokrat) to do so. He was further supported by the Golkar party, who selected Sofyan Edi Jarwoko, Golkar's Malang chairman, as his running mate.

== Campaign ==
In March 2018, the Corruption Eradication Commission (KPK) designated both Mochammad Anton and Ya'qud Ananda as suspects in a bribery case related to the passing of the city's 2015 budget, and they were arrested on 27 March 2018. KPK also designated a large number of DPRD members as suspects in the same corruption case. Due to the arrest, Anton and Ya'qud were both absent from public mayoral debates held on 7 April 2018. KPK deputy chairman Basaria Panjaitan denied claims of any links of the arrests to the mayoral election, noting that the case had been under investigation since August 2017. While both Anton and Ya'qud were still eligible to vote, neither did as they were incarcerated in Jakarta.

== Results ==
Candidate	Running mate	Party	Votes	%
Sutiaji	Sofyan Edi Jarwoko	Demokrat	165,194	44.54
Mochammad Anton	Syamsul Mahmud	PKB	135,710	36.59
Yaqud Ananda Gudban	Ahmad Wanedi	Hanura	69,973	18.87
Total			370,877	100.00
Valid votes			370,877	93.23
Invalid/blank votes			26,945	6.77
Total votes			397,822	100.00
Registered voters/turnout			600,646	66.23

== Aftermath ==
Sutiaji was examined by KPK investigators in 29–30 August 2018 regarding sources of campaign funds, and was summoned as a witness for the same corruption case in April the following year. He was not arrested or designated as a suspect, and was sworn in as mayor on 24 September 2018 and served the full five-year term.

After the election, Anton and Ya'qud were sentenced to prison terms of two years and four years and eight months, respectively.
