= Wahyu Hidayat =

Indonesian politician (born 1966)

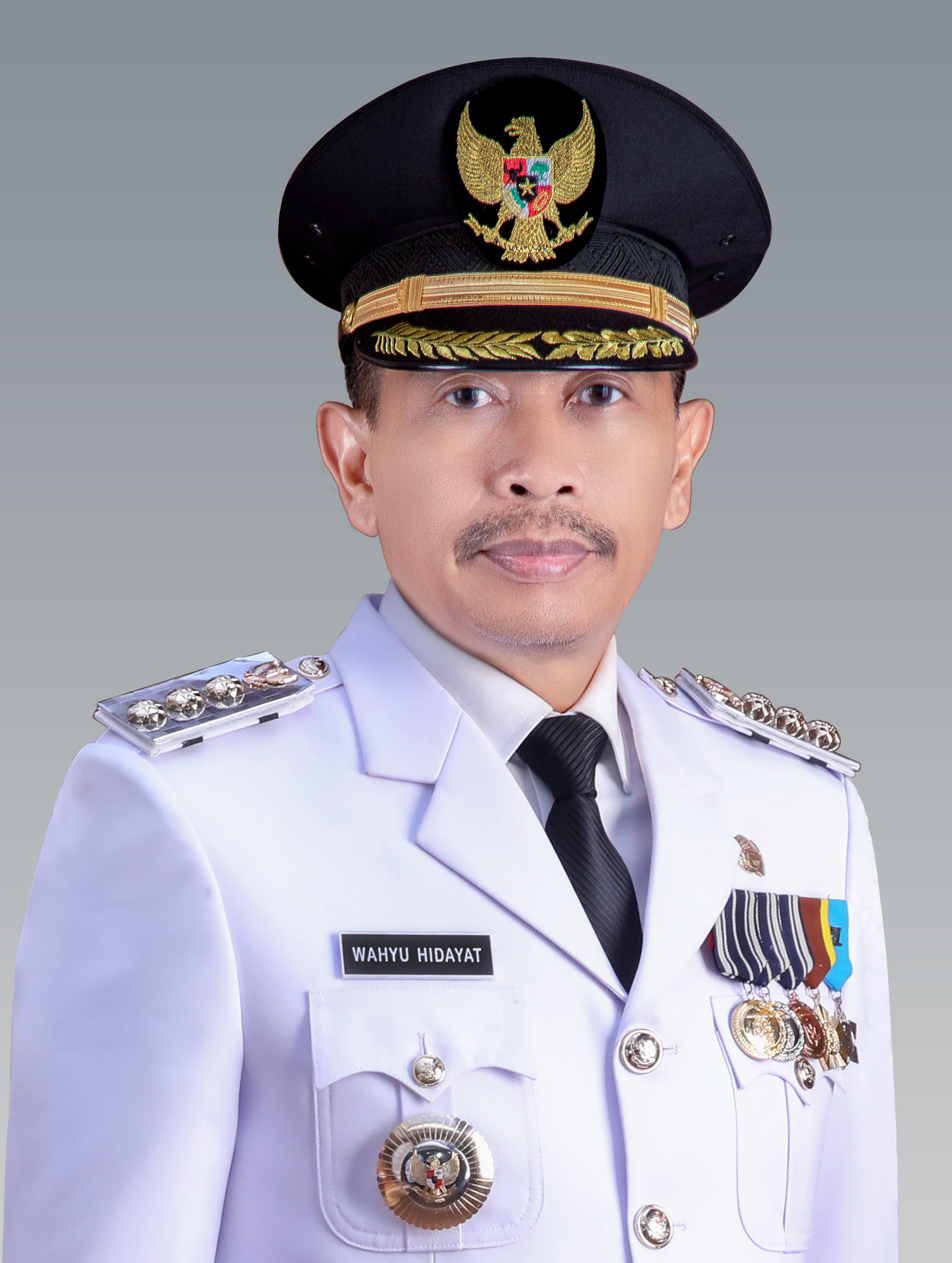

13th Mayor of Malang
- Incumbent
- Assumed office 20 February 2025
- President: Prabowo Subianto
- Governor: Khofifah Indar Parawansa
- Deputy: Ali Muthohirin
- Preceded by: Iwan Kurniawan (Pj.)

Acting Mayor of Malang
- In office 24 September 2023 – 10 August 2024
- President: Joko Widodo
- Governor: Khofifah Indar Parawansa
- Preceded by: Sutiaji
- Succeeded by: Iwan Kurniawan (Pj.)

Personal details
- Born: December 17, 1966 (age 59) Malang, East Java
- Party: Gerindra Party (2024–now)
- Spouse: Alm. Hanik Andriani
- Children: 1
- Education: Malang National Institute of Technology (Ir.); Mitra Indonesia College of Economics (M.M.); Merdeka University Malang (Dr.)
- Profession: Politician, Bureaucrat

Wahyu Hidayat (born 17 December 1966) is an Indonesian bureaucrat and politician from the Gerindra Party who has served as mayor of Malang since 2025. He previously served as acting mayor from 2023 to 2024, and as regional secretary of Malang Regency from 2020 to 2023.

== Personal life ==
Hidayat is married. He has one daughter.

Political offices
| Preceded by Iwan Kurniawan (Pj.) | Mayor of Malang; 2025–2030 | Succeeded by Incumbent |
| Preceded by Sutiaji | Action Mayor of Malang; 2023–2024 | Succeeded by Iwan Kurniawan (Pj.) |
