= State University of Malang =

University in Indonesia

- Motto: The Learning University
- Type: State university
- Established: October 18, 1954
- Rector: Prof. Dr. Hariyono, M.Pd.
- Academic staff: 1,007 (2017)
- Administrative staff: 1,127 (2017)
- Students: 32,958 (2017)
- Location: Jalan Semarang 5, Malang 65145, Malang and Blitar, East Java, Indonesia; 7.962995°S 112.618447°E
- Campus: Urban − Malang Suburban − Sawojajar, Malang Suburban − Blitar
- Colors: Blue
- Nickname: UM
- Website: um.ac.id

The State University of Malang (Indonesian: Universitas Negeri Malang, abbreviated as UM), formerly the Institute of Teacher Education and Educational Sciences of Malang (Indonesian: Institut Keguruan dan Ilmu Pendidikan Malang, abbreviated as IKIP Malang), is one of the state universities in Indonesia. Located in Malang and Blitar, East Java, UM was established in October 18, 1954 as PTPG Malang, as School of Education of Airlangga University, making it one of the oldest teaching institutes in Indonesia. UM was separated from Airlangga University on 20 May 1964 to become IKIP Malang. In 1999, IKIP Malang formally changed its status from an institute to a state university.

In 2010, UM ranked 6th as the best university in Indonesia by Webometrics, but sank to 16th in 2015. However, also in 2015, UM was accredited as an A-class university by the National Accreditation Board of Higher Education (BAN-PT) with a score of 372 points, just below UGM (378) and IPB (375).

== Campus ==
The main teaching, learning and research activities are conducted at the main campus, which is located at Jl. Semarang 5 Malang. The second campus is located at Jl. Ki Ageng Gribig 45 Sawojajar, Malang, and the third campus is located at Jl. Ir Soekarno No 3 Blitar.

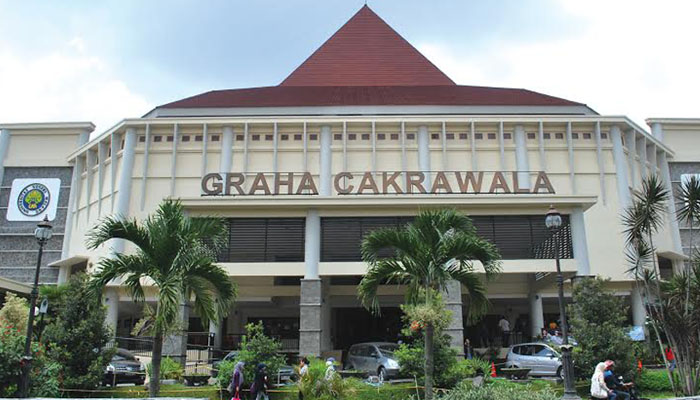
Graha Cakrawala

Graha Cakrawala that is located in the main campus of State University of Malang, has been used for national and international events, mostly for sports and arts events, and has a seating capacity over 7000.

== Notable alumni ==
- Muhadjir Effendy, Minister of Culture and Education 2016-2019
- Awang Faroek Ishak, Governor of East Kalimantan
- Peni Suparto, Former Mayor of Malang
- Mario Teguh, entrepreneur

== BISTIC ==
Every year, the Department of Management of the Faculty of Economics and Business of Universitas Negeri Malang holds the Business Innovation Sustainability and Technology International Conference (BISTIC). The BISTIC annual conference is considered one of the leading forums in Indonesia for eminent personalities, academia and students to interact. BISTIC organises a number of plenary sessions as well as a keynote address every year. Featuring a wide range of distinguished speakers, BISTIC facilitates the exchange of innovative ideas, thoughts, and disciplines, as well as a forum for dialogue and debate.

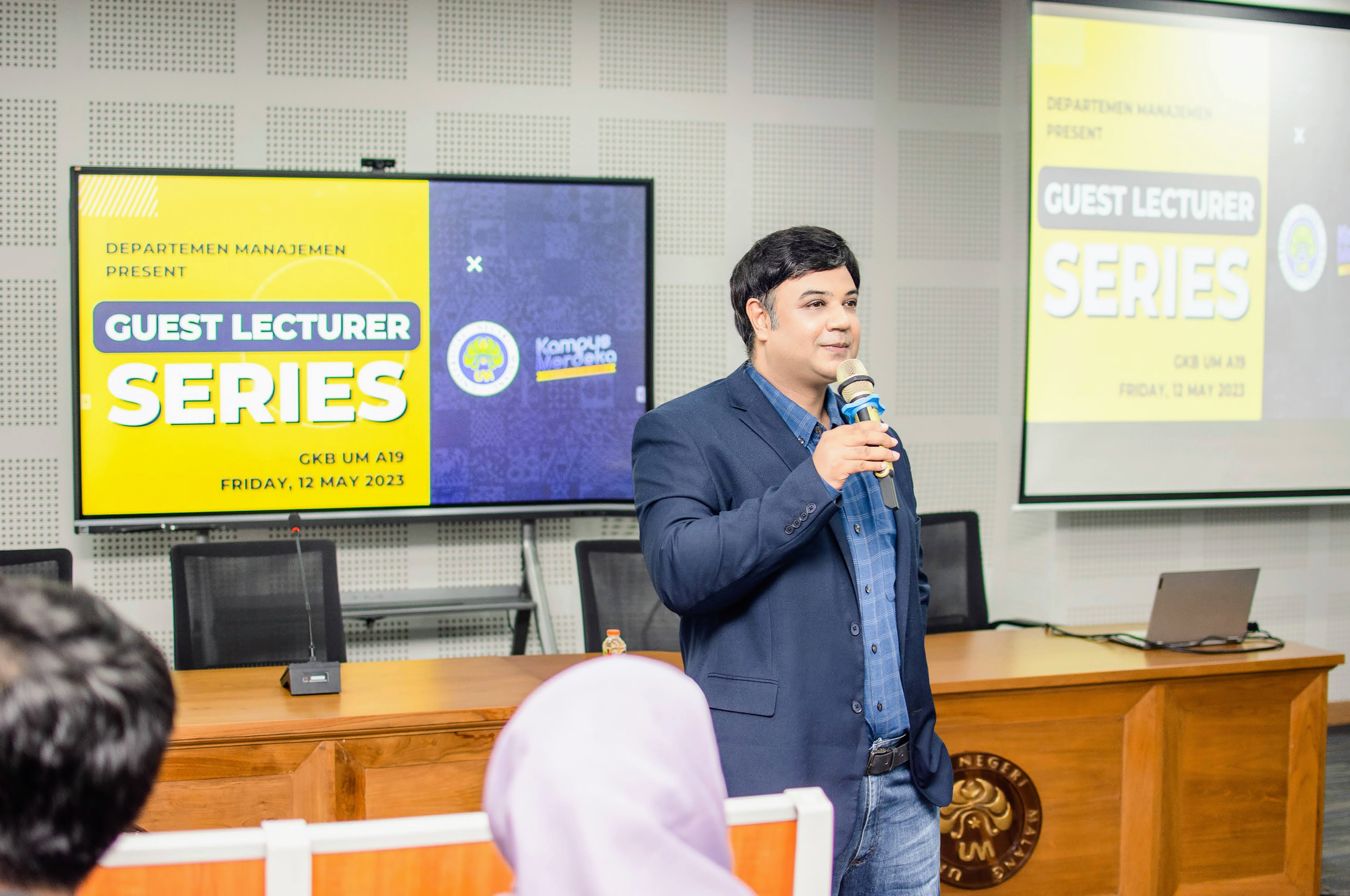
Siddhartha Paul Tiwari Keynote address at BISTIC 2023
