= Mario Teguh =

Indonesian businessman

- Born: Sis Maryono Teguh; 5 March 1956 (age 70); Makassar, Indonesia
- Education: IKIP Malang
- Occupation: Businessman
- Spouses: Aryani Soenarto (m. 1984; div. 1993); Linna Teguh (m. 1995)
- Website: www.marioteguh.asia

Mario Teguh (born Sis Maryono Teguh; 5 March 1956) is an Indonesian businessman. In 2010, Teguh has been listed as one of 8 Personality Changes version of newspaper Republika. Teguh had more popularity in public when he was a presenter for Mario Teguh Golden Ways on Metro TV.

Before he began his career, Teguh worked in several banks, including Citibank, BSB Bank, and Aspac Bank. Teguh was also establishing for his businessman Exnal Corp Jakarta where he was CEO and senior consultant. Teguh presented a show, titled Business Art on O Channel.

== Career ==
- Citibank Indonesia (1983–1986) as Head of Sales
- BSB Bank (1986–1989) as Manager Business Development
- Aspac Bank (1990–1994) as Vice President Marketing & Organization Development
- Exnal Corp Jakarta (1994–present) as CEO & Senior Consultant

== Education ==
- Department of Architecture New Trier West High (level SMA) in Chicago, United States, 1975.
- Department of Linguistics and language education, Institut Keguruan dan Ilmu Pendidikan Malang (S-1).
- Department of International Business, Sophia University, Tokyo, Japan.
- Department of Operations Systems, Indiana University, United States, 1983 (MBA).

== Books ==
- Becoming a Star (2006)
- One Million Second Chances (2006)
- Life Changer (2009)
- Leadership Golden Ways (2009)

== Controversy ==
On 7 September 2016, a 30-year-old man named Ario Kiswinar openly admitted to being the unrecognized son of Mario Teguh, on the TV show Hitam Putih. Ario showed his birth certificate, family card, and a copy of his parents' marriage certificate. The birth certificate states that Ario was born on 29 April 1986 to a father named Sis Maryono Teguh and Aryani Soenarto. Responding to this confession, Mario Teguh asked to do a DNA test in an interview with Kompas TV on 9 September 2016. The results of the DNA test conducted by Ario Kiswinar Teguh and Mario Teguh have come out, this was announced by the Head of Public Relations of the Metro Jaya Police, Senior Commissioner Awi Setiyono on Friday, 25 November 2016. From the results of the DNA test, Ario Kiswinar Teguh was declared a child biological father of Sis Maryono Teguh with a previous marriage to Aryani Soenarto. However, it seems that Linna Teguh, Mario Teguh's current wife, finds it difficult to accept the results of the DNA test.
