= Sukun, Malang =

Sukun
- District
- Kecamatan Sukun
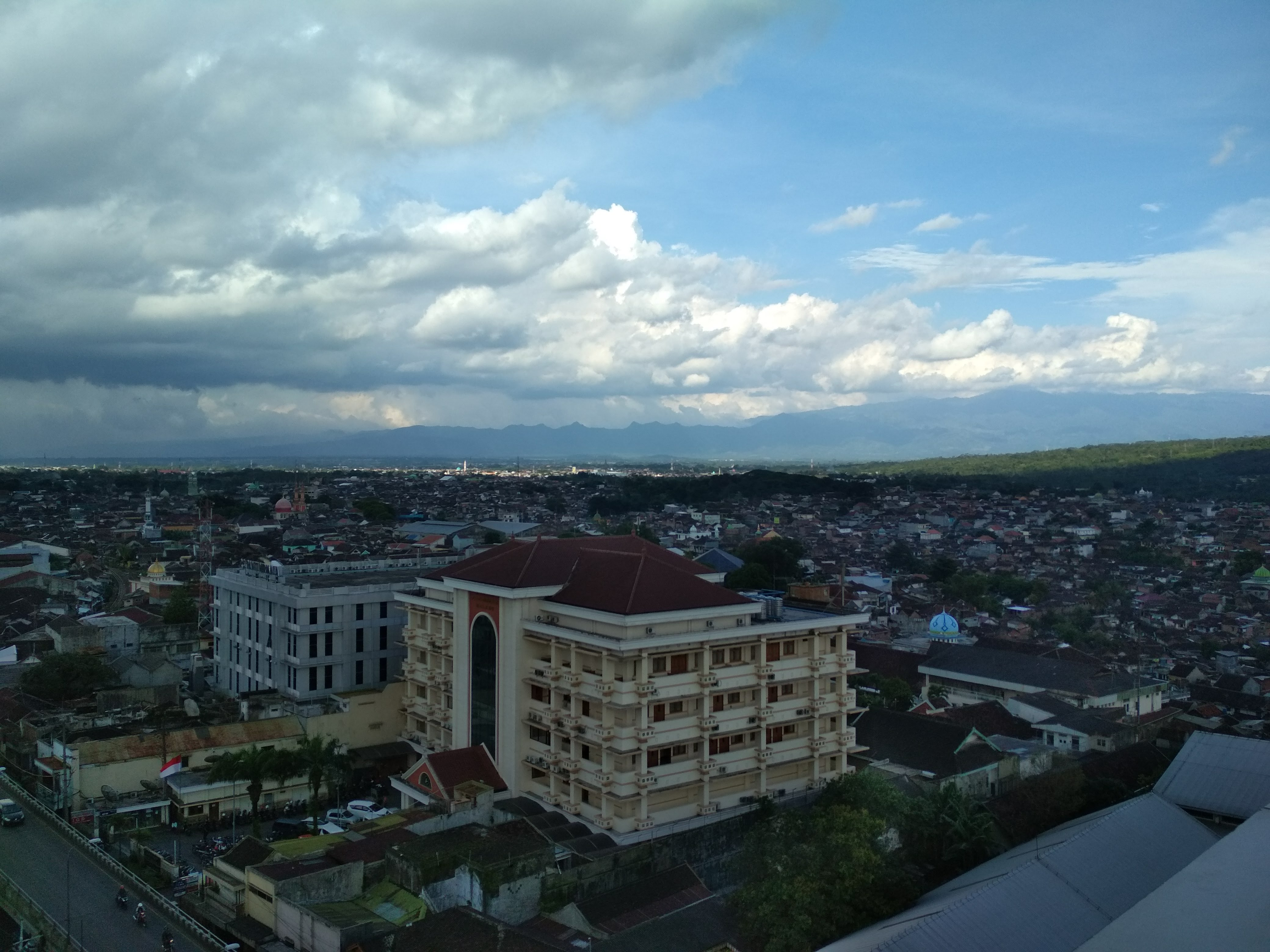
- View of Sukun from The Balava Hotel

- Map of Malang with Sukun highlighted
- Coordinates: 8.004975°S 112.618558°E
- Country: Indonesia
- Province: East Java
- City: Malang

Area
  - Total: 26.55 km^{2} (10.25 sq mi)
- Elevation: 445 m (1,460 ft)

Population (2010)
  - Total: 181,513
  - Density: 6,837/km^{2} (17,710/sq mi)
- Website: kecsukun.malangkota.go.id

Sukun is a district (kecamatan) in Malang, East Java, Indonesia. Bentoel Group, one of oldest and most famous Indonesian tobacco companies, is based in the district.

== Subdistricts ==
There are 11 subdistricts (kelurahan) in Sukun:

- Bandulan, postal code 65146
- Karangbesuki, postal code 65146
- Pisangcandi, postal code 65146
- Mulyorejo, postal code 65147
- Sukun, postal code 65147
- Tanjungrejo, postal code 65147
- Bakalankrajan, postal code 65148
- Bandungrejosari, postal code 65148
- Ciptomulyo, postal code 65148
- Gadang, postal code 65149
- Kebonsari, postal code 65149

== Geography ==
=== Climate ===
The climate in Sukun features tropical monsoon climate (Am) according to Köppen–Geiger climate classification system, as the climate precipitation throughout the year is greatly influenced by the monsoon, bordering with subtropical highland climate (Cwb). Most months of the year are marked by significant rainfall. The short dry season has little impact. The average temperature in Sukun is 23.7 °C. In a year, the average rainfall is 2079 mm.

Climate data for Sukun, Malang (elevation 445 m or 1,460 ft)
Month	Jan	Feb	Mar	Apr	May	Jun	Jul	Aug	Sep	Oct	Nov	Dec	Year
Mean daily maximum °C (°F)	28.5 (83.3)	28.5 (83.3)	28.5 (83.3)	28.7 (83.7)	29 (84)	28.9 (84.0)	28.3 (82.9)	29.3 (84.7)	29.8 (85.6)	30.3 (86.5)	29.6 (85.3)	28.4 (83.1)	29.0 (84.1)
Daily mean °C (°F)	24.1 (75.4)	24.1 (75.4)	24 (75)	24 (75)	23.9 (75.0)	23.3 (73.9)	22.3 (72.1)	23.1 (73.6)	23.6 (74.5)	24.4 (75.9)	24.4 (75.9)	23.7 (74.7)	23.7 (74.7)
Mean daily minimum °C (°F)	19.7 (67.5)	19.7 (67.5)	19.5 (67.1)	19.3 (66.7)	18.9 (66.0)	17.7 (63.9)	16.4 (61.5)	17 (63)	17.5 (63.5)	18.5 (65.3)	19.2 (66.6)	19 (66)	18.5 (65.4)
Average precipitation mm (inches)	333 (13.1)	304 (12.0)	290 (11.4)	172 (6.8)	131 (5.2)	78 (3.1)	46 (1.8)	26 (1.0)	41 (1.6)	106 (4.2)	226 (8.9)	326 (12.8)	2,079 (81.9)
Average relative humidity (%)	81.7	82.3	82.2	79.2	79.8	77.3	75.1	72.9	70.9	70.9	74.4	79.1	77.1
Source 1: Climate-Data.org (temp & precip)
Source 2: Weatherbase (humidity)

== See also ==
- Districts of East Java
- List of districts of Indonesia
