= Mochammad Anton =

Indonesian politician and businessman

- 魏兴安
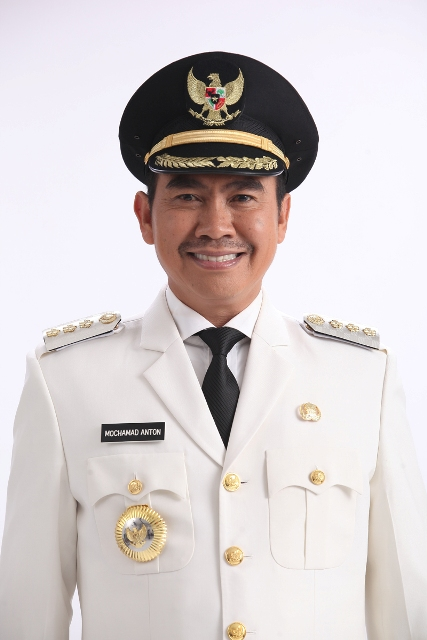

11th Mayor of Malang
- In office 13 September 2013 – 12 September 2018
- Preceded by: Peni Suparto
- Succeeded by: Sutiaji

Personal details
- Born: 31 December 1965 (age 60) Malang, East Java, Indonesia

Mochammad Anton (born 31 December 1965) is an Indonesian politician and businessman who was the mayor of Malang, East Java between 2013 and 2018. In 2018, he was convicted of bribery and sentenced to 2 years in prison.

== Early life ==
Anton (Chinese: 魏兴安 Goei Hing An) was born in Malang on 31 December 1965 from Goei Heng An and Sumiati. He worked as a driver throughout high school and when he was studying at a university in Surabaya, and continued to do so after dropping out due to financial reasons.

== Career ==
Around 1998, he entered the treacle business, which was then seen as a waste product by sugar refineries, supplying flavoring factories. By 2013, he claimed to be supplying around 300,000 tons of treacle annually, with links to sugarcane farmers in West, Central and East Java. He also participated in the local offices of Nahdlatul Ulama and later the National Awakening Party (PKB).

=== Mayor ===
In 2013, Anton participated in Malang's mayoral election with the endorsement of PKB and Gerindra, winning after securing 179,675 votes. He was sworn in on 13 September 2013, becoming the city's first Chinese Indonesian mayor. His work as mayor included the reduction of bureaucratic procedures and the establishment of "thematic" villages to where the localities would develop unique products. In addition, the city also set up injection wells and waste banks.

On 27 March 2018, Anton was arrested by the Corruption Eradication Commission for bribing the city council to approve the 2015 budget. Large numbers of the city councillors were also arrested. He was sentenced to 2 years in prison and fined Rp 100 million on 10 August 2018. He was released from prison after completing his term on 29 March 2020.

During his arrest, Anton would lose in the city's mayoral election - while still winning 135,710 votes (36.59%) - and he was succeeded by his deputy Sutiaji.
