= Malang City Regional House of Representatives =

Municipal legislature of the city of Malang, East Java, Indonesia

Malang City Regional House of Representatives Dewan Perwakilan Rakyat Daerah Kota Malang
- 2024—2029 Period
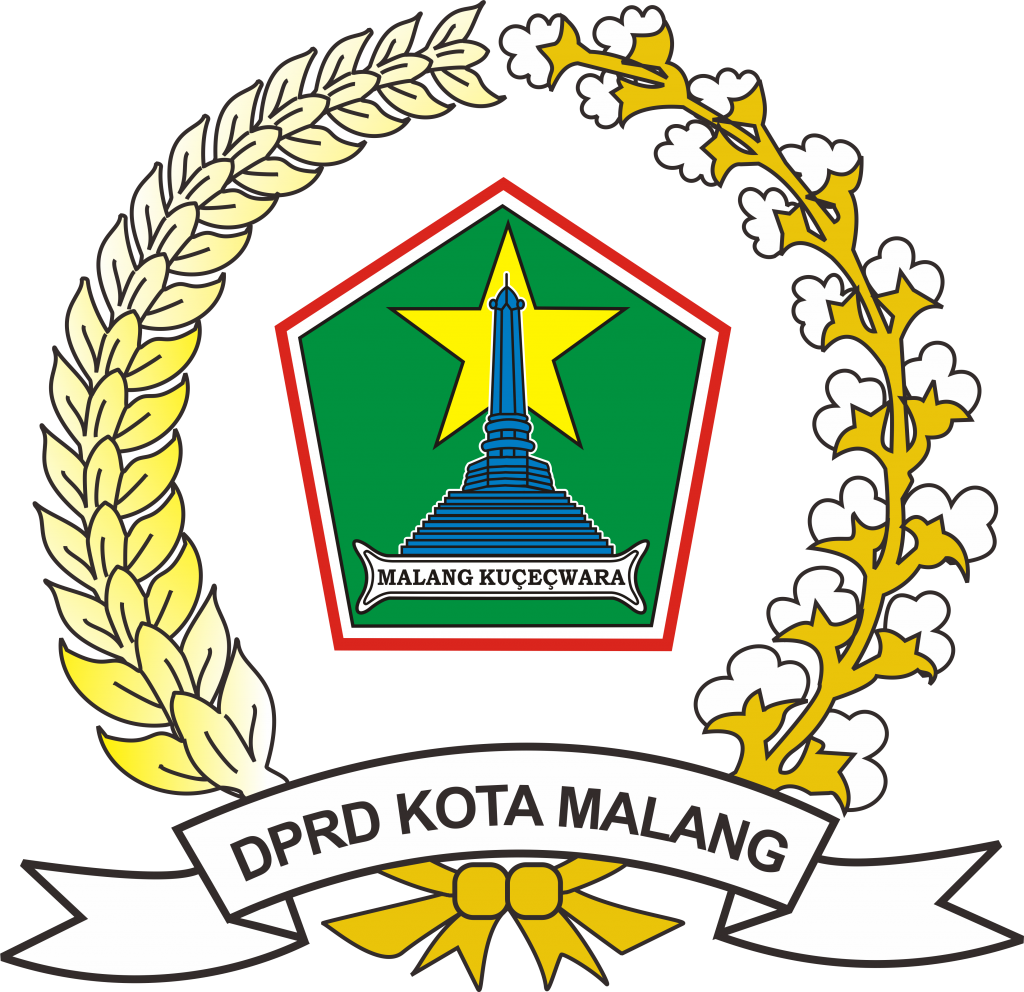

Type
- Type: Unicameral
- Term limits: 5 years

Leadership
- Speaker: Amithya Ratnanggani Sirraduhita, PDI-P since 24 October 2024
- Deputy Speaker: Abdurrochman, PKB since 24 October 2024
- Deputy Sepeker: Trio Agus Purwono, PKS since 24 October 2024
- Deputy Speaker: Rimzah, Gerindra since 24 Oktober 2024

Structure
- Seats: 45
- Political groups: Government (24): PKS (7); Gerindra (6); Golkar (6); NasDem (3); PSI (2); Opposition (21): PDI-P (9); PKB (8); Democratic (3); PAN (1)

Elections
- Voting system: Open list
- Last general election: 14 February 2024
- Next general election: 2029

Website
- dprd.malangkota.go.id

The Malang City Regional House of Representatives (Indonesian: Dewan Perwakilan Rakyat Daerah Kota Malang, DPRD Kota Malang) is the unicameral municipal legislature of the city of Malang, East Java, Indonesia. It has 45 members, who are elected every five years, simultaneously with the national legislative election.

== History ==
Malang was granted its status as a municipality by the Dutch East Indies government in 1914, with the municipal council founded on 6 October 1914. In 1922, the municipal council moved to its current modern location at Alun-Alun Tugu. During the Dutch period, the council consisted of 11 members, of which 8 were Dutch, 2 were native Indonesians, and the last seat was allocated for non-native groups such as Arabs or Chinese.

Under an independent Indonesia, the city council was reestablished in 1950, as a provisional legislature. The first elected council served between 1951 and 1956.

In 2018, 40 out of 45 members of the legislature were arrested as suspects for bribery, in a case which also implicated mayor Mochammad Anton and another former legislator Ya'qud Ananda Gudban who had resigned to run in that year's mayoral election. The arrested members were accused of having received payments ranging from Rp 12.5 to 50 million (USD 842 to 3,368) in order to approve the proposed municipal budget in 2015. 40 replacements were sworn in around a week following the arrests in order to maintain the municipal government's functions. All 40 were found guilty of the charges, and received sentences ranging from 4 to 5 years.

== General election results ==
=== 2024 Indonesian legislative election ===
The official valid votes received by political parties contesting the 2024 Indonesian legislative election in each electoral district (constituency) for members of the Malang City Regional House of Representatives are as follows.

2024 Indonesian legislative election results

Electoral district	PKB	Gerindra	PDI-P	Golkar	NasDem	Labour	Gelora	PKS	PKN	Hanura	Garuda	PAN	PBB	Democratic	PSI	Perindo	PPP	Ummat	Valid votes
Malang City 1	5,660	9,499	9,587	8,200	3,465	317	126	9,199	51	49	153	2,500	109	1,874	4,354	628	1,080	155	57,006
Malang City 2	12,756	11,843	19,065	11,768	7,526	869	403	13,898	361	267	177	8,688	143	8,965	6,852	1,224	2,524	709	108,038
Malang City 3	27,767	12,189	18,458	16,784	4,870	714	285	15,066	150	134	345	4,221	124	6,834	4,157	4,099	3,096	464	119,757
Malang City 4	19,777	12,452	22,793	12,096	10,325	583	338	10,714	224	324	169	4,405	88	12,011	5,196	4,298	1,743	304	117,840
Malang City 5	13,806	20,649	17,223	9,298	5,863	840	328	17,472	118	140	102	3,582	576	2,759	5,542	580	1,851	517	101,246
Total	79,766	66,632	87,126	58,146	32,049	3,323	1,480	66,349	904	914	946	23,396	1,040	32,443	26,101	10,829	10,294	2,149	503,887
Source: General Elections Commission of Indonesia

== Composition ==
For the 2024–2029 period, PDI-P is the largest party in the legislature, with 9 seats. Its leadership consists of a speaker and three deputy speakers.

Legislative period	PDI-P	PKB	PKS	Gerindra	Golkar	Nasdem	Demokrat	PSI	PAN	Perindo	Hanura	PPP	PDS	PKPB	Total
2004–2009	12	8	5		5		7		5			1	2	—	45
2009–2014	9	5	5	2	5		12		4		1	–	1	1	45
2014–2019	11	6	3	4	5	1	5		4		3	3			45
2019–2024	12	7	6	5	5	2	3	1	3	1	–				45
2024–2029	9	8	7	6	6	3	3	2	1	–					45

Members are assigned into one of four commissions – Commission A on government, Commission B on Economics and Finance, Commission C on Development, and Commission D on Public Welfare.

== Election ==
In the 2019 election, the city was divided into five multi-member electoral districts from which the legislators were elected. The electoral districts are coterminous with the 5 city districts.

== Electoral District ==
In the 2019 Legislative Election and the 2024 Legislative Election, the Malang City Regional House of Representatives election was divided into 5 electoral districts as follows:

Electoral District Name	Electoral District Area	Number of Seats (2019)	Number of Seats (2024)
MALANG CITY 1	Klojen	6	▼5
MALANG CITY 2	Blimbing	10	10
MALANG CITY 3	Kedungkandang	10	▲11
MALANG CITY 4	Sukun	10	10
MALANG CITY 5	Lowokwaru	9	9
TOTAL		45	45

== See also ==
- East Java Regional House of Representatives
- Malang
- East Java
