= Blimbing, Malang =

Blimbing
- District
- Kecamatan Blimbing
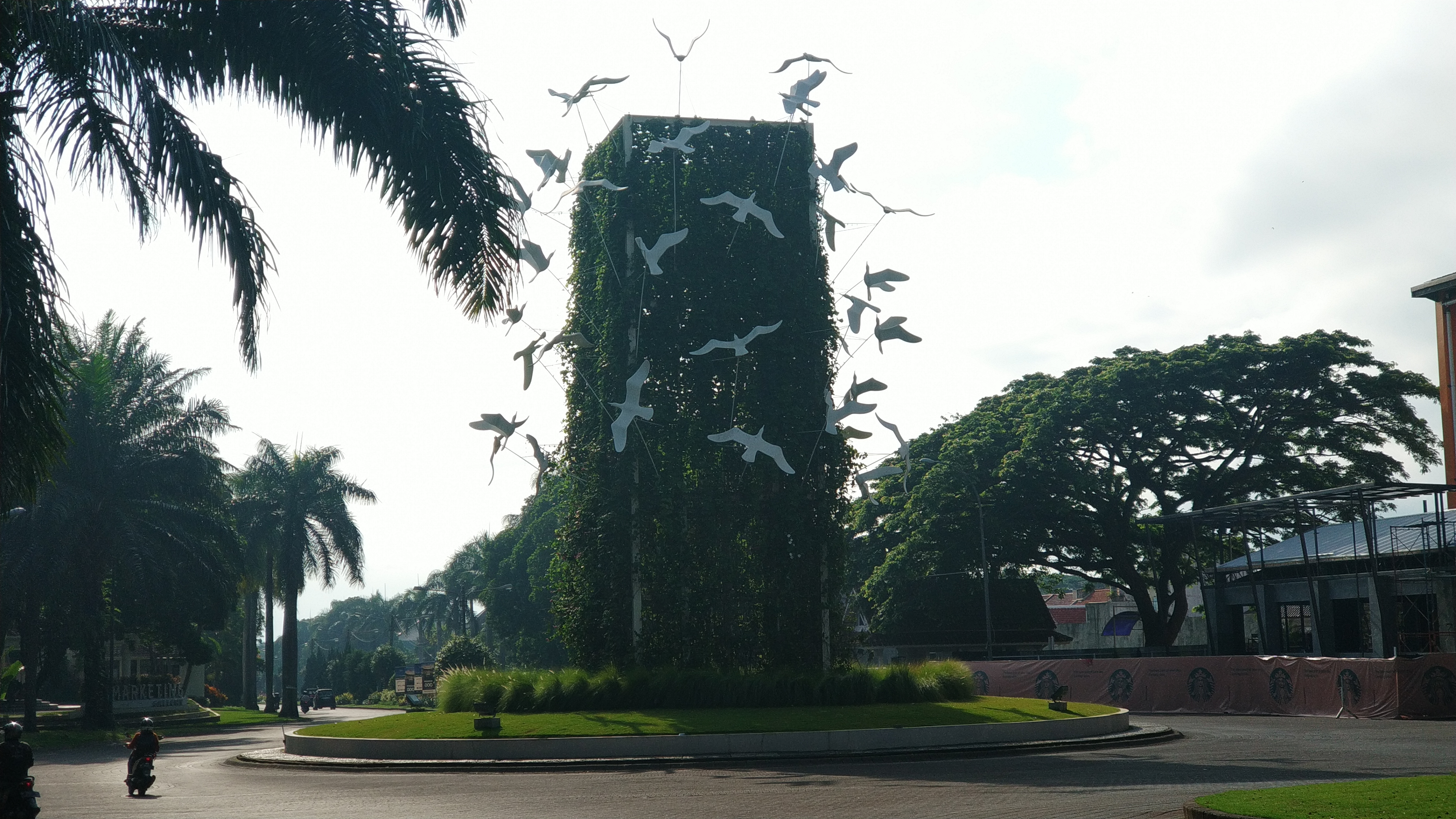
- Gate Monument of Araya in Blimbing

- Map of Malang with Blimbing highlighted
- Coordinates: 7.930403°S 112.651971°E
- Country: Indonesia
- Province: East Java
- City: Malang

Area
  - Total: 17.76 km^{2} (6.86 sq mi)
- Elevation: 456 m (1,496 ft)

Population (2010)
  - Total: 172,333
  - Density: 9,703/km^{2} (25,130/sq mi)
- Website: kecblimbing.malangkota.go.id

Blimbing is a district (kecamatan) in Malang, East Java, Indonesia. Blimbing is the entrance to northern side of Malang city proper.

== History ==
In 1767, Malang was governed by a Duke of Malojo Kusumo who later surrendered to the Dutch colonial. To strengthen its position, the Dutch East Indies established a fortress on the side of the Brantas river. Followed by establishing a Dutch residence (loge) on either side of the fort. On 1 April 1914, the colonial government established Malang as Gemeente or Kotapraja, a government administered by the city council. On 12 November 1918, the city council of the election was formed. In 1919 the first Burgemeester was H.I. Bussemaker and in 1930 there was a change in village structure to become the Office of Environmental Government.

In 1942, in the Japanese era, there was a division of territory for Burgemeester, namely only the City area which oversees four neighborhoods or four Wijkmeester. After 1942, the Buergemeester area was divided into 3 sub-districts, namely Klojen, Blimbing and Kedung Kandang . In 1988, Malang City had 5 districts namely Blimbing, Klojen District, Kedungkandang, Lowokwaru, and Sukun. In 2002 the Blimbing District Office was originally located on Jalan Bantaran, moved location on Jalan Raden Intan Kav. 14 Malang.

== Districts ==
There are 11 urban villages (kelurahan) in Blimbing:

- Kesatrian, postal code 65121
- Polehan, postal code 65121
- Purwantoro, postal code 65122
- Bunulrejo, postal code 65123
- Pandanwangi, postal code 65124
- Blimbing, postal code 65125
- Purwodadi, postal code 65125
- Arjosari, postal code 65126
- Balearjosari, postal code 65126
- Polowijen, postal code 65126
- Jodipan, postal code 65127
- Pakaryakar, postal code 65127

== Geography ==
=== Climate ===
The climate in Blimbing features tropical monsoon climate (Am) according to Köppen–Geiger climate classification system, as the climate precipitation throughout the year is greatly influenced by the monsoon, bordering with subtropical highland climate (Cwb). Most months of the year are marked by significant rainfall. The short dry season has little impact. The average temperature in Blimbing is 23.8 °C. In a year, the average rainfall is 2098 mm.

Climate data for Blimbing, Malang (elevation 456 m or 1,496 ft)
Month	Jan	Feb	Mar	Apr	May	Jun	Jul	Aug	Sep	Oct	Nov	Dec	Year
Mean daily maximum °C (°F)	28.6 (83.5)	28.6 (83.5)	28.6 (83.5)	28.7 (83.7)	29.1 (84.4)	28.9 (84.0)	28.4 (83.1)	29.4 (84.9)	29.9 (85.8)	30.3 (86.5)	29.6 (85.3)	28.5 (83.3)	29.1 (84.3)
Daily mean °C (°F)	24.2 (75.6)	24.2 (75.6)	24.1 (75.4)	24 (75)	24 (75)	23.3 (73.9)	22.4 (72.3)	23.3 (73.9)	23.7 (74.7)	24.4 (75.9)	24.4 (75.9)	23.7 (74.7)	23.8 (74.8)
Mean daily minimum °C (°F)	19.8 (67.6)	19.8 (67.6)	19.6 (67.3)	19.4 (66.9)	19 (66)	17.8 (64.0)	16.5 (61.7)	17.2 (63.0)	17.6 (63.7)	18.6 (65.5)	19.3 (66.7)	19 (66)	18.6 (65.5)
Average precipitation mm (inches)	337 (13.3)	315 (12.4)	296 (11.7)	174 (6.9)	132 (5.2)	75 (3.0)	46 (1.8)	26 (1.0)	46 (1.8)	105 (4.1)	221 (8.7)	325 (12.8)	2,098 (82.7)
Average relative humidity (%)	81.7	82.3	82.2	79.2	79.8	77.3	75.1	72.9	70.9	70.9	74.4	79.1	77.1
Source 1: Climate-Data.org (temp & precip)
Source 2: Weatherbase (humidity)

== See also ==
- Districts of East Java
- List of districts of Indonesia
