= List of universities in Indonesia =

This is a list of universities, colleges, polytechnics and other higher education in Indonesia.

According to the former Directorate General of Higher Education (now part of the Ministry of Research, Technology, & Higher Education), in 2022 there were 4,004 higher education institutions (3,820 private and 184 public). Higher education in Indonesia offers, academic degrees, vocational degrees, and professional degrees. They are provided by the following types of institutions:

- Community Academy provides vocational education for diploma one and/or diploma two programs in regencies/municipalities based on local excellence or to meet special needs.
- Academy, offers vocational education in a number of fields of common origin such as a military academy and nursing academy.
- Polytechnic, offers vocational education, and/or professional education in various fields
- Specialised College (Sekolah Tinggi), offers academic education and can provide vocational and/or professional education in 1 (one) specific cluster
- Institute, offers academic education and can provide vocational and/or professional education in a number of fields of common origin (technological cluster for example)
- University, offers academic education, and can provide vocational education, and/or professional education in various fields

There are several levels of degrees that can be achieved in higher education, which are split into six levels:

- D1 - Ahli Pratama (A.P.) is a one-year education program consisting of 32 credits and a final assignment in the form of practical work and scientific work reports. The title translates to "Primary Expert".
- D2 - Ahli Muda (A.Ma.) is a two-year education program consisting of 64 credits. The title translates to "Young Expert".
- D3 - Ahli Madya (A.Md.) is a three-year higher education programm consisting of 112 credits. The title translates to "Associate Expert".
- D4 - Sarjana Terapan (S.Tr.) is a four-year higher education programm consisting of 144 credits. The title translates to "Bachelor of Applied [...]" followed by the subject.
- S1 - Sarjana is a four to seven years higher education program, depending on the university, which requires a scientific thesis. This is equivalent to a bachelor's degree.
- S2 - Magister is a one to two year graduate program which requires a scientific thesis. This is equivalent to a master's degree.
- S3 - Doktor: is a three to seven years graduate program which requires a scientific dissertation.

== Public higher education institutions ==
There are 125 public higher education institutions divided into 63 public universities, 13 Institutes, 44 Polytechnics, and 5 Community Colleges. Public universities in Indonesia are the major component of Indonesia's higher education system. Public universities and higher education institutions are generally sought after by students and seen as more prestigious than private ones. Indonesian students from all over the country applied to the public universities, colleges, institutes, academies, and polytechnics through several different means of applications or exams. The first means to apply in public universities in Indonesia are SNBP and SNBT. SNBP is short for "Seleksi Nasional Berdasarkan Prestasi" or "National Selection Based on Achievements", which is based on school grades and achievements of the student and without exam. Meanwhile, SNBT is short for "Seleksi Nasional Berdasarkan Tes" or "National Selection Based on Test", which is based on scores of a unified nation-wide entrance exam. These two national selections were formerly called SNMPTN (Indonesian: Seleksi Nasional Masuk Perguruan Tinggi Negeri) and SBMPTN (Indonesian: Seleksi Bersama Masuk Perguruan Tinggi Negeri). There are also another national entrance exams such as, SBMPN (Indonesian: Seleksi Bersama Masuk Politeknik Negeri) for state polytechnics, SPAN (Indonesian: Seleksi Perguruan Tinggi Agama Negeri) for religious universities or colleges which is divided into SPAN-PTKIN for state-owned Islamic colleges and Selnas-PTKKN for state-owned Christian colleges. Other than nation-wide exams or selections, each universities also held their own entrance exams as separate means to apply to the university through their own localized exam.

=== Public universities ===
PT Code 001-	Name	Abbrev.	Founding Date	Location	Accred.	Link
001	Gadjah Mada University; Universitas Gadjah Mada	UGM	1949, 19 December	Sleman and Yogyakarta, Special Region of Yogyakarta	Excellent	
002	University of Indonesia; Universitas Indonesia	UI	1849, 2 January (as Dokter-Djawa School Batavia); 1950, 2 February (as Universiteit Indonesia); 1955, 11 July (as current university)	Jakarta and Depok, West Java	Excellent	
003	University of North Sumatra; Universitas Sumatera Utara	USU	1952, 20 August	Medan, North Sumatra	Excellent	
004	Airlangga University; Universitas Airlangga	UNAIR	1954, 1 November	Surabaya, East Java; 7°16′18″S 112°45′29″E	Excellent	
005	Hasanuddin University; Universitas Hasanuddin	UNHAS	1956, 10 September	Makassar, South Sulawesi	Excellent	
006	Andalas University; Universitas Andalas	UNAND	1955, 13 September	Padang, West Sumatra	Excellent	
007	Padjadjaran University; Universitas Padjadjaran	UNPAD	1957, 11 September	Bandung and Jatinangor, West Java	Excellent	
008	Diponegoro University; Universitas Diponegoro	UNDIP	1957, 9 January	Semarang, Central Java; 7.049°S 110.438°E	Excellent	
009	Sriwijaya University; Universitas Sriwijaya	UNSRI	1960, 29 October	Palembang and Indralaya, South Sumatra	Excellent	
010	Lambung Mangkurat University; Universitas Lambung Mangkurat	ULM	1958, 1 September	Banjarmasin and Banjarbaru, South Kalimantan	A	
011	Syiah Kuala University; Universitas Syiah Kuala	USK	1961, 2 September	Banda Aceh, Aceh	Excellent	
012	Sam Ratulangi University; Universitas Sam Ratulangi	UNSRAT	1965, 14 September	Manado, North Sulawesi	Excellent	
013	Udayana University; Universitas Udayana	UNUD	1962, 17 August	Badung, Bali; 8°47′56″S 115°10′19″E	Excellent	
014	Nusa Cendana University; Universitas Nusa Cendana	UNDANA	1962, 1 September	Kupang, East Nusa Tenggara; 10.1545227°S 123.6590252°E	Very Good	
015	Mulawarman University; Universitas Mulawarman	UNMUL	1962, 27 September	Samarinda, East Kalimantan	Very Good	
016	University of Mataram; Universitas Mataram	UNRAM	1962, 1 October	Mataram, West Nusa Tenggara	Very Good	
017	University of Riau; Universitas Riau	UNRI	1962, 1 September	Pekanbaru, Riau; 0.4764°N 101.3806°E	A	
018	Cenderawasih University; Universitas Cenderawasih	UNCEN	1962, 10 November	Jayapura, Papua	B	
019	Brawijaya University; Universitas Brawijaya	UB	1963, 5 January	Malang, East Java	Excellent	
020	University of Jambi; Universitas Jambi	UNJA	1963, 26 March	Jambi (city), Jambi	B	
021	Pattimura University; Universitas Pattimura	UNPATTI	1963, 23 April	Ambon, Maluku	B	
022	Tanjungpura University; Universitas Tanjungpura	UNTAN	1959, 20 May	Pontianak, West Kalimantan	A	
023	Jenderal Soedirman University; Universitas Jenderal Soedirman	UNSOED	1963, 23 September	Purwokerto and Purbalingga, Central Java	Excellent	
024	University of Palangkaraya; Universitas Palangkaraya	UPR	1963, 10 November	Palangka Raya, Central Kalimantan	Very Good	
025	University of Jember; Universitas Jember	UNEJ	1964, 10 November	Jember, East Java	Excellent	
026	University of Lampung; Universitas Lampung	UNILA	1965, 22 September	Bandar Lampung, Lampung; 5°21′52.24″S 105°14′36.38″E	Excellent	
027	Sebelas Maret University; Universitas Sebelas Maret	UNS	1976, 11 March	Surakarta, Central Java	Excellent	
028	Tadulako University; Universitas Tadulako	UNTAD	1981, 1 May	Palu, Central Sulawesi	Excellent	
029	Halu Oleo University; Universitas Halu Oleo	UHO	1981, 19 August	Kendari, Southeast Sulawesi; 4°0′31.72″S 122°31′21.65″E	B	
030	University of Bengkulu; Universitas Bengkulu	UNIB	1982, 24 April	Bengkulu (city), Bengkulu; 3°45′35.27″S 102°16′20.8″E	B	
031	Indonesia Open University; Universitas Terbuka	UT	1984, 4 September	South Tangerang, Banten; 6°20′41.6″S 106°45′29.11″E	A	
032	State University of Padang; Universitas Negeri Padang	UNP	1954, 23 October	Padang, West Sumatra	Excellent	
033	State University of Malang; Universitas Negeri Malang	UM	1954, 18 October	Malang and Blitar, East Java; 7°57′46.78″S 112°37′6.41″E	Excellent	
034	Indonesia University of Education; Universitas Pendidikan Indonesia	UPI	1954, 20 October	Bandung, West Java; 6°51′48.24″S 107°35′39.48″E	Excellent	
035	State University of Manado; Universitas Negeri Manado	UNIMA	1955, 22 September	Minahasa, North Sulawesi; 1°15′59.7″N 124°52′59.4″E	B	
036	State University of Makassar; Universitas Negeri Makassar	UNM	1961, 1 August	Makassar, South Sulawesi	Excellent	
037	State University of Jakarta; Universitas Negeri Jakarta	UNJ	1964, 16 May	Jakarta; 6°11′40.2″S 106°52′43.7″E	Excellent	
038	State University of Yogyakarta; Universitas Negeri Yogyakarta	UNY	1964, 21 May	Sleman and Yogyakarta, Special Region of Yogyakarta	Excellent	
039	State University of Surabaya; Universitas Negeri Surabaya	UNESA	1964, 19 December	Surabaya, East Java	Excellent	
040	State University of Medan; Universitas Negeri Medan	UNIMED	1956	Medan, North Sumatra	A	
041	State University of Semarang; Universitas Negeri Semarang	UNNES	1965	Semarang, Central Java; 7°2′55.4″S 110°23′22.7″E	Excellent	
042	Sultan Ageng Tirtayasa University; Universitas Sultan Ageng Tirtayasa	UNTIRTA	1981	Serang and Cilegon, Banten	B	
043	Trunojoyo University; Universitas Trunojoyo	UNIJOYO	1964, 15 August	Bangkalan, East Java; 7°7′39.9″S 112°43′23.1″E	Very Good	
044	Khairun University; Universitas Khairun	UNKHAIR	1964, 15 August	Ternate, North Maluku; 0°45′45.2″N 127°20′10.6″E	B	
045	University of Papua; Universitas Papua	UNIPA	2000, 3 November	Manokwari, West Papua	Very Good	
046	Malikussaleh University; Universitas Malikussaleh	UNIMAL	1969, 12 June	North Aceh, Aceh; 5°14′2.56″N 96°59′14.22″E	B	
047	State University of Gorontalo; Universitas Negeri Gorontalo	UNG	1963, 1 September	Gorontalo, Gorontalo; 0°33′23.07″N 123°3′48.98″E	Excellent	
048	Ganesha University of Education; Universitas Pendidikan Ganesha	UNDIKSHA	2006, 11 Mei	Singaraja, Bali	A	
049	University of Bangka Belitung; Universitas Bangka Belitung	UBB	2006, 12 April	Pangkalpinang, Bangka Belitung; 2°4′11.8″S 106°4′38.7″E	B	
050	Borneo Tarakan University; Universitas Borneo Tarakan	UBT	1999, 9 October	Tarakan, North Kalimantan; 3°18′11.3″N 117°38′55.8″E	B	
051	Musamus Merauke University; Universitas Musamus Merauke	UNMUS	2001, 26 January	Merauke, South Papua; 8°31′54.7″S 140°25′1.5″E	Very Good	
052	Raja Ali Haji Maritime University; Universitas Maritim Raja Ali Haji	UMRAH	2007, 1 August	Tanjungpinang, Riau Islands	Very Good	
053	Samudra University; Universitas Samudra	UNSAM	1985, 22 October	Langsa, Aceh; 4°27′27.4″N 97°58′17.3″E	Very Good	
054	University of West Sulawesi; Universitas Sulawesi Barat	UNSULBAR	2004, 22 September	Majene, West Sulawesi	Good	
055	Sembilanbelas November University; Universitas Sembilanbelas November	USN	1984, 16 April	Kolaka, Southeast Sulawesi	Good	
056	Tidar University; Universitas Tidar	UNTIDAR	1980	Magelang, Central Java	B	
057	Siliwangi University; Universitas Siliwangi	UNSIL	1978	Tasikmalaya, West Java	B	
058	Teuku Umar University; Universitas Teuku Umar	UTU	2006, 10 November	Meulaboh, Aceh; 4°8′44.2″N 96°11′50.4″E	Very Good	
059	University of National Development "Veteran" East Java; Universitas Pembangunan Nasional "Veteran" Jawa Timur	UPNVJT	1959, 5 July	Surabaya, East Java; 7°20′0″S 112°47′24″E	A	
060	Timor University; Universitas Timor	UNIMOR	2000, 16 July	North Central Timor, East Nusa Tenggara; 9°30′45.7″S 124°30′41.8″E	Good	
061	University of National Development "Veteran" Jakarta; Universitas Pembangunan Nasional "Veteran" Jakarta	UPNVJ	1967, 21 February	Jakarta	B	
062	University of National Development "Veteran" Yogyakarta; Universitas Pembangunan Nasional "Veteran" Yogyakarta	UPNYK	1958, 15 December	Sleman, Special Region of Yogyakarta	B	
063	University of Singaperbangsa Karawang; Universitas Singaperbangsa Karawang	UNSIKA	1982, 2 February	Karawang, West Java	B	

=== Public institutes ===
There are 13 Public Institutes in Indonesia: 5 Institutes of Technology, 1 Institute of Agriculture, 4 Institute of Arts (ISI), and 3 Institute of Arts and Culture (ISBI).

Two more Institute of Arts and Culture is planned in East Kalimantan and South Sulawesi. However, ISBI Kaltim and ISBI Sulsel in form of ISI Yogyakarta and ISI Surakarta's PSDKU has no definite timeline in being separated.

Code 002-	Name	Abbrev.	Year Founded	Location		Accred.	Ref
Code 002-	Name	Abbrev.	Year Founded	Province	City	Accred.	Ref
001	Bandung Institute of Technology (Institut Teknologi Bandung)	ITB	1920	West Java	Bandung	3/3 stars	
002	Sepuluh Nopember Institute of Technology (Institut Teknologi Sepuluh Nopember)	ITS	1957	East Java	Surabaya	3/3 stars	
003	IPB University (Institut Pertanian Bogor)	IPB	1963	West Java	Bogor	3/3 stars	
005	Indonesian Institute of the Arts, Yogyakarta (Institut Seni Indonesia Yogyakarta)	ISI Yogyakarta	1984	Special Region of Yogyakarta	Bantul	3/3 stars	
007	Indonesian Institute of the Arts, Denpasar (Institut Seni Indonesia Denpasar)	ISI Denpasar	1967	Bali	Denpasar	3/3 stars	
008	Indonesian Institute of the Arts, Surakarta (Institut Seni Indonesia Surakarta)	ISI Surakarta	1964	Central Java	Surakarta	2/3 stars	
009	Indonesian Institute of the Arts, Padang Panjang (Institut Seni Indonesia Padang Panjang)	ISI Padang Panjang	1965	West Sumatra	Padang Panjang	2/3 stars	
010	Bandung Institute of Indonesian Arts and Culture (Institut Seni Budaya Indonesia Bandung)	ISBI Bandung	1968	West Java	Bandung	2/3 stars	
011	Aceh Institute of Indonesian Arts and Culture (Institut Seni Budaya Indonesia Aceh)	ISBI Aceh	2014	Aceh	Great Aceh	1/3 stars	
012	Tanah Papua Institute of Indonesian Arts and Culture (Institut Seni Budaya Indonesia Tanah Papua)	ISBI Tanah Papua	2014	Papua	Jayapura	0/3 stars	
013	Kalimantan Institute of Technology (Institut Teknologi Kalimantan)	ITK	2014	East Kalimantan	Balikpapan	2/3 stars	
014	Sumatera Institute of Technology (Institut Teknologi Sumatera)	ITERA	2014	Lampung	South Lampung	1/3 stars	
015	Habibie Institute of Technology (Institut Teknologi Bacharuddin Jusuf Habibie)	ITH	2014	South Sulawesi	Parepare	1/3 stars	

=== Public polytechnics ===
Currently, there are 44 Public Polytechnics in Indonesia. They consist of 1 Electronic Engineering Polytechnic, 2 Manufacturing Polytechnics, 1 Maritime Polytechnic, 1 Fishery Polytechnic, 1 Shipbuilding Polytechnic, 4 Agricultural Polytechnics, and 34 "general" Polytechnics.

PT Code 005-	Name	Abbrev.	Founding Date	Location	Accred.	Link
001	Bandung Polytechnic for Manufacturing; Politeknik Manufaktur Bandung	POLMAN	1977, 24 March	Bandung, West Java	Very Good	
002	Jakarta State Polytechnic; Politeknik Negeri Jakarta	PNJ	1982, 22 September	Depok, West Java	Excellent	
003	Medan State Polytechnic; Politeknik Negeri Medan	POLMED	1982, 20 September	Medan, North Sumatra	B	
004	Bandung State Polytechnic; Politeknik Negeri Bandung	POLBAN	1979, 27 January	Bandung, West Java	Excellent	
005	Semarang State Polytechnic; Politeknik Negeri Semarang	POLINES	1982, 6 August	Semarang, Central Java	A	
006	Sriwijaya State Polytechnic; Politeknik Negeri Sriwijaya	POLSRI	1982, 20 September	Palembang, South Sumatra	Very Good	
007	Lampung State Polytechnic; Politeknik Negeri Lampung	POLINELA	1984, 7 April	Bandar Lampung, Lampung	Very Good	
008	Ambon State Polytechnic; Politeknik Negeri Ambon	POLNAM	1987, 5 October	Ambon, Maluku (province)	B	
009	Padang State Polytechnic; Politeknik Negeri Padang	PNP	1985, 12 March	Padang, West Sumatra	Very Good	
010	Bali State Polytechnic; Politeknik Negeri Bali	PNB	1985, 3 December	Kuta, Bali	Very Good	
011	Pontianak State Polytechnic; Politeknik Negeri Pontianak	POLNEP	1985, 3 December	Pontianak, West Kalimantan	B	
012	Ujung Pandang State Polytechnic; Politeknik Negeri Ujung Pandang	PNUP	1987, 10 May	Makassar, South Sulawesi	Very Good	
013	Manado State Polytechnic; Politeknik Negeri Manado	POLIMDO	1987, 9 November	Manado, North Sulawesi	B	
014	Surabaya Shipbuilding State Polytechnic; Politeknik Perkapalan Negeri Surabaya	PPNS	1987, 17 September	Surabaya, East Java	A	
015	Banjarmasin State Polytechnic; Politeknik Negeri Banjarmasin	POLIBAN	1987, 13 July	Banjarmasin, South Kalimantan	B	
016	Lhokseumawe State Polytechnic; Politeknik Negeri Lhokseumawe	PNL	1987, 5 October	Lhokseumawe, Aceh	Very Good	
017	Kupang State Polytechnic; Politeknik Negeri Kupang	PNK	1985, 11 March	Kupang, East Nusa Tenggara	Good	
018	Electronic Engineering Polytechnic Institute of Surabaya; Politeknik Elektronika Negeri Surabaya	PENS	1986, 29 May	Surabaya, East Java	A	
019	Jember State Polytechnic; Politeknik Negeri Jember	POLIJE	1988, 29 October	Jember, East Java	B	
020	Pangkajene Kepulauan State Polytechnic for Agriculture; Politeknik Pertanian Negeri Pangkajene Kepulauan	POLIPANGKEP	1990, 9 September	Pangkep, South Sulawesi	B	
021	Kupang State Agricultural Polytechnic; Politeknik Pertanian Negeri Kupang	POLITANIKOE	1984, 7 April	Kupang, East Nusa Tenggara	B	
022	Tual State Polytechnic for Fisheries; Politeknik Perikanan Negeri Tual	POLIKANT	1997, 18 July	Tual, Maluku	Very Good	
023	Malang State Polytechnic; Politeknik Negeri Malang	POLINEMA	1979, 27 January	Malang, East Java	B	
024	Samarinda State Agricultural Polytechnic; Politeknik Pertanian Negeri Samarinda	POLITANI Samarinda	1997, 28 April	Samarinda, East Kalimantan	B	
025	Payakumbuh State Agricultural Polytechnic; Politeknik Pertanian Negeri Payakumbuh	PPNP	1989, 6 February	Payakumbuh, West Sumatra	B	
026	Samarinda State Polytechnic; Politeknik Negeri Samarinda	POLNES	1985, 3 December	Samarinda, East Kalimantan	B	
027	Creative Media State Polytechnic; Politeknik Negeri Media Kreatif	POLIMEDIA	2008, 8 October	Jakarta	Very Good	
028	Bangka Belitung State Polytechnic for Manufacturing; Politeknik Manufaktur Negeri Bangka Belitung	POLMANBABEL	2010, 18 October	Sungailiat, Bangka Belitung Islands	Good	
029	Batam State Polytechnic; Politeknik Negeri Batam	POLIBATAM	2010, 18 October	Batam, Riau Islands	Very Good	
030	Nusa Utara State Polytechnic; Politeknik Negeri Nusa Utara	POLNUSTAR	2011, 22 June	Tahuna, North Sulawesi	Very Good	
031	Bengkalis State Polytechnic; Politeknik Negeri Bengkalis	POLBENG	2011, 29 July	Bengkalis, Riau	Very Good	
032	Balikpapan State Polytechnic; Politeknik Negeri Balikpapan	POLTEKBA	2011, 9 September	Balikpapan, East Kalimantan	Very Good	
033	Madura State Polytechnic; Politeknik Negeri Madura	POLTERA	2012	Sampang, East Java	Very Good	
034	Indonesia Maritime State Polytechnic; Politeknik Maritim Negeri Indonesia	POLIMARIN	2012, 19 September	Semarang, Central Java	Very Good	
035	Banyuwangi State Polytechnic; Politeknik Negeri Banyuwangi	POLIWANGI	2008	Banyuwangi, East Java	Very Good	
036	Madiun State Polytechnic; Politeknik Negeri Madiun	PNM	2012, 30 October	Madiun, East Java	Very Good	
037	Fakfak State Polytechnic; Politeknik Negeri Fakfak	POLINEF	2012	Fakfak, West Papua	Good	
038	Sambas State Polytechnic; Politeknik Negeri Sambas	POLTESA	2007	Sambas, West Kalimantan	Very Good	
039	Tanah Laut State Polytechnic; Politeknik Negeri Tanah Laut	POLITALA	2009, 25 September	Tanah Laut, South Kalimantan	B	
040	Subang State Polytechnic; Politeknik Negeri Subang	POLSUB	2014, 1 April	Subang, West Java	Good	
041	Ketapang State Polytechnic; Politeknik Negeri Ketapang	POLITAP	2006	Ketapang, West Kalimantan	Good	
042	Cilacap State Polytechnic; Politeknik Negeri Cilacap	PNC	2014, 3 October	Cilacap, Central Java	Good	
043	Indramayu State Polytechnic; Politeknik Negeri Indramayu	POLINDRA	2008, 8 July	Indramayu, West Java	Good	
044	Nunukan State Polytechnic; Politeknik Negeri Nunukan	PNN	2014, 8 October	Nunukan, North Kalimantan	Good	

=== Public community colleges ===
PT Code 006-	Name	Abbrev.	Founding Date	Location	Accred.	Link
001	State Community College of Pacitan; Akademi Komunitas Negeri Pacitan	AKN Pacitan	2013, 11 October	Pacitan, East Java	Good	
002	State Community College of Putra Sang Fajar Blitar; Akademi Komunitas Negeri Putra Sang Fajar Blitar	AKB	2014, 17 October	Blitar, East Java	Good	
003	State Community College of West Aceh; Akademi Komunitas Negeri Aceh Barat	AKN Aceh Barat	2014, 17 October	West Aceh, Aceh	Good	
004	State Community College of Rejang Lebong; Akademi Komunitas Negeri Rejang Lebong	AKREL	2018, 4 April	Rejang Lebong, Bengkulu	Good	
005	State Community College of Arts and Culture Yogyakarta; Akademi Komunitas Negeri Seni dan Budaya Yogyakarta	AKNSB Yogyakarta	2020	Bantul, Special Region of Yogyakarta		

== Public Religious higher education institutions ==
Public religious higher education institutions (PTKN) are under the responsibility of the Ministry of Religious Affairs. Technically and academically, the development of state religious universities is carried out by the Ministry of Education, Culture, Research and Technology of the Republic of Indonesia (Kemdikbudristek), while functionally it is carried out by the Ministry of Religion, all covering the five recognized religions in Indonesia, but not including Confucianism. There are three types of higher education institutions in the Muslim category, Public Islamic Universities (UIN), Public Islamic Institutes (IAIN), and Public Islamic Colleges (STAIN). Public Christian Institutes (IAKN) and Public Protestant Christian Colleges (STAKPN) in the Protestant Christian category. Public Catholic Colleges (STAKATN) in the Catholic category. Public Hindu Universities (UHN), Public Hindu Institutes (IAHN), and Public Hindu Colleges (STAHN) in the Hindu category. Public Buddhist Colleges (STABN) in the Buddhist category.

=== Public Islamic higher education institutions ===
==== Public Islamic Universities ====
PT Code 201-	Name	Abbrev.	Founding Date	Location	Accred.	Link
001	Syarif Hidayatullah State Islamic University Jakarta; Universitas Islam Negeri Syarif Hidayatullah Jakarta	UIJKT	1957, 1 June (as Akademi Dinas Ilmu Agama)	South Tangerang, Tangerang	Excellent	
002	Sunan Kalijaga State Islamic University Yogyakarta; Universitas Islam Negeri Sunan Kalijaga Yogyakarta	UINSUKA	1951, 26 September (as IAIN Sunan Kalijaga); 2004, June 21 (as current university)	Sleman, Special Region of Yogyakarta	Excellent	
003	Maulana Malik Ibrahim State Islamic University Malang; Universitas Islam Negeri Maulana Malik Ibrahim Malang	UINMALIKI	1957, 21 March (as IAIN Maulana Malik Ibrahim); 2004, June 21 (as current university)	Malang, East Java	Excellent	
004	Sunan Gunung Djati State Islamic University Bandung; Universitas Islam Negeri Sunan Gunung Djati Bandung	UINSGD	1968, 8 April (as IAIN Sunan Gunung Djati); 2005, 10 October (as current university)	Bandung, West Java	Excellent	
005	Sultan Syarif Kasim State Islamic University Riau; Universitas Islam Negeri Sultan Syarif Kasim Riau	UINSUSKA	1970, 19 September (as IAIN Sulthan Syarif Qasim); 2005, 4 January (as current university)	Pekanbaru, Riau	B	
006	Alauddin State Islamic University Makassar; Universitas Islam Negeri Alauddin Makassar	UINAM	1965, 28 October	Makassar, South Sulawesi	Excellent	
007	Sunan Ampel State Islamic University Surabaya; Universitas Islam Negeri Sunan Ampel Surabaya	UINSA	1965 (as IAIN Sunan Ampel); 2013, 1 October (as current university)	Surabaya, East Java	Excellent	
008	State Islamic University of North Sumatra; Universitas Islam Negeri Sumatera Utara	UINSU	1973, 19 November (as IAIN Sumatera Utara); 2014, 17 October (as current university)	Medan, North Sumatra	B	
009	Raden Fatah State Islamic University Palembang; Universitas Islam Negeri Raden Fatah Palembang	UINRAFA	1964, 13 November (as IAIN Raden Fatah); 2014, 17 October (as current university)	Palembang, South Sumatra	Excellent	
010	Walisongo State Islamic University Semarang; Universitas Islam Negeri Walisongo Semarang	UINWS	1970, 6 April (as IAIN Walisongo); 2013, 1 October (as current university)	Semarang, Central Java	A	
011	Ar-Raniry State Islamic University Banda Aceh; Universitas Islam Negeri Ar-Raniry Banda Aceh	UINAR	1960 (as IAIN Ar-Raniry); 2013, 1 October (s current university)	Banda Aceh, Aceh	Excellent	
012	Sultan Maulana Hasanuddin State Islamic University Banten; Universitas Islam Negeri Sultan Maulana Hasanuddin Banten	UINSMH	2017, 7 April	Serang, Banten	B	
013	Imam Bonjol State Islamic University Padang; Universitas Islam Negeri Imam Bonjol Padang	UINIB	1966, 29 November (as IAIN Imam Bonjol); 2017, 7 April (as current university)	Padang, West Sumatra	B	
014	Raden Intan State Islamic University Lampung; Universitas Islam Negeri Raden Intan Lampung	UINRIL	1968, 26 October (as IAIN Raden Intan); 2017, 3 April (as current university)	Bandar Lampung, Lampung	Excellent	
015	State Islamic University of Mataram; Universitas Islam Negeri Mataram	UINMA	1966 (as IAIN Mataram); 2017, 7 April (as current university)	Mataram, West Nusa Tenggara	B	
016	Sultan Thaha Saifuddin State Islamic University Jambi; Universitas Islam Negeri Sultan Thaha Saifuddin Jambi	UINSTS	1967, 8 September (as IAIN Sultan Thaha Saifuddin); 2017, 7 April (as current university)	Jambi (city), Jambi	Very Good	
017	Antasari State Islamic University Banjarmasin; Universitas Islam Negeri Antasari Banjarmasin	UINANTASARI	1964, 20 November (as IAIN Antasari); 2017, 3 April (as current university)	Banjarmasin, South Kalimantan	Very Good	
018	International Islamic University of Indonesia; Universitas Islam Internasional Indonesia	UIII	2016, 29 June	Depok, West Java		
019	Sayyid Ali Rahmatullah State Islamic University Tulungagung; Universitas Islam Negeri Sayyid Ali Rahmatullah Tulungagung	UINSATU	2021, 11 May	Tulungagung, East Java	B	
020	Professor Kiai Haji Saifuddin Zuhri State Islamic University Purwokerto; Universitas Islam Negeri Profesor Kiai Haji Saifuddin Zuhri Purwokerto	UINSAIZU	1997, 21 Maret (as STAIN Purwokerto); 2014 (as IAIN Purwokerto); 2021, 11 May (as current university)	Purwokerto, Central Java	Excellent	
021	Raden Mas Said State Islamic University Surakarta; Universitas Islam Negeri Raden Mas Said Surakarta	UINRMS	1992, 12 September; 1997 (as STAIN Surakarta); 2011 (as IAIN Surakarta); 2021, 11 May (as current university)	Surakarta, Central Java	Excellent	
022	Sultan Aji Muhammad Idris State Islamic University Samarinda; Universitas Islam Negeri Sultan Aji Muhammad Idris Samarinda	UINSI	1997, 21 Maret (as STAIN Samarinda); 2014 (as IAIN Samarinda); 2021, 11 May (as current university)	Samarinda, East Kalimantan	B	
023	Kiai Haji Achmad Siddiq State Islamic University Jember; Universitas Islam Negeri Kiai Haji Achmad Siddiq Jember	UINKHAS	1997, 21 Maret (as STAIN Jember); 2014 (as IAIN Jember); 2021, 11 May (as current university)	Jember, East Java	B	
024	Fatmawati Sukarno State Islamic University Bengkulu; Universitas Islam Negeri Fatmawati Sukarno Bengkulu	UINFAS	1997, 21 Maret (as STAIN Bengkulu); 2014 (as IAIN Bengkulu); 2021, 11 May (as current university)	Bengkulu (city), Bengkulu	B	
025	Datokarama State Islamic University Palu; Universitas Islam Negeri Datokarama Palu	UINDAK	1997, 21 Maret (as STAIN Datokarama); 2021, 8 July (as current university)	Palu, Central Sulawesi	Very Good	
026	Mahmud Yunus State Islamic University Batusangkar; Universitas Islam Negeri Mahmud Yunus Batusangkar	UINMY	1997, 21 March (as STAIN Batusangkar); 2015, 23 December (as IAIN Batusangkar); 2022, 8 Juny (as current university)	Tanah Datar, West Sumatra	Very Good	
027	Sjech M. Djamil Djambek State Islamic University Bukittinggi; Universitas Islam Negeri Sjech M. Djamil Djambek Bukittinggi	UINSMDD	1997, 21 March (as STAIN Bukittinggi); 2014, 18 December (as IAIN Bukittinggi); 2022, 8 Juny (as current university)	Bukittinggi, West Sumatra	Very Good	
028	Kiai Haji Abdurrahman Wahid State Islamic University Pekalongan; Universitas Islam Negeri Kiai Haji Abdurrahman Wahid Pekalongan	UINGUSDUR	1997, 21 March (as STAIN Pekalongan); 2016, 1 August (as IAIN Pekalongan); 2022, 8 Juny (as current university)	Pekalongan, Central Java	B	
029	Syekh Ali Hasan Ahmad Addary State Islamic University Padangsidimpuan; Universitas Islam Negeri Syekh Ali Hasan Ahmad Addary Padangsidimpuan	UINSYAHDA	1997, 21 Maret (as STAIN Padangsidimpuan); 2013, 30 July (as IAIN Padangsidimpuan); 2022, 8 Juny (as current university)	Padang Sidempuan, North Sumatra	Very Good	
030	State Islamic University of Salatiga; Universitas Islam Negeri Salatiga	UINSALATIGA	1997, 21 March (as STAIN Salatiga); 2014, 17 October (as IAIN Salatiga); 2022, 8 Juny (as current university)	Salatiga, Central Java	B	
031	Syekh Nurjati State Islamic University Cirebon; Universitas Islam Negeri Siber Syekh Nurjati Padangsidimpuan	UINSSC	1997, 21 March (as STAIN Cirebon); 2009, 10 November (as IAIN Syekh Nurjati); 2024 (as current university)	Cirebon, West Java	B	
032	State Islamic University of Madura; Universitas Islam Negeri Madura	UINMDR	1997, 21 March (as STAIN Pamekasan); 2018, 5 April (as current institute); 2025, 8 May (as current university)	Pamekasan, East Java	B	
033	Sunan Kudus State Islamic University; Universitas Islam Negeri Sunan Kudus	UINSUKU	1997, 21 March (as STAIN Kudus); 2018, 5 April (as current institute); 2025, 8 May (as current university)	Kudus, Central Java	Very Good	
034	Syekh Wasil State Islamic University Kediri; Universitas Islam Negeri Syekh Wasil Kediri	UINSW	1997, 21 March (as STAIN Kediri); 2018, 5 April (as current institute); 2025, 8 May (as current university)	Kediri, East Java	B	
035	Kiai Ageng Muhammad Besari State Islamic University Ponorogo; Universitas Islam Negeri Kiai Ageng Muhammad Besari Ponorogo	UINPO	1997, 21 March (as STAIN Ponorogo); 2016, 1 August (as current institute); 2025, 8 May (as current university)	Ponorogo, East Java	B	
036	Sultanah Nahrasiyah State Islamic University Lhokseumawe; Universitas Islam Negeri Sultanah Nahrasiyah Lhokseumawe	UINSUNA	2016, 1 August	Lhokseumawe, Aceh	Very Good	
037	Jurai Siwo State Islamic University Lampung; Universitas Islam Negeri Jurai Siwo Lampung	UINJUSILA	1997, 21 March (as STAIN Jurai Siwo); 2016, 1 August (as current institute); 2025, 8 May (as current university)	Metro, Lampung	B	
038	State Islamic University of Palangka Raya; Universitas Islam Negeri Palangka Raya	UINPKY	1997, 21 March (as STAIN Pangka Raya); 2014, 17 October (as current institute); 2025, 8 May (as current university)	Palangka Raya, Central Kalimantan	Very Good	
039	State Islamic University of Palopo; Universitas Islam Negeri Palopo	UINPALOPO	1997, 21 March (as STAIN Palopo); 2014, 17 October (as current institute); 2025, 8 May (as current University)	Palopo, South Sulawesi	B	
040	Abdul Muthalib Sangadji State Islamic University Ambon; Universitas Islam Negeri Abdul Muthalib Sangadji Ambon	UINAMSA	1997, 21 March (as STAIN Ambon); 2006, 9 December (as current institute); 2025, 8 May (as current university)	Ambon, Maluku	Very Good	
041	Sultan Amai State Islamic University Gorontalo; Universitas Islam Negeri Sultan Amai Gorontalo	UINSMART	1997, 21 Maret (as STAIN Sultan Amai); 2004, 18 October (as current institute); 2026, 16 July (as current university)	Gorontalo, Gorontalo	B	
042	State Islamic University of Kendari; Universitas Islam Negeri Kendari	UIN Kendari	1997, 21 March (as STAIN Kendari); 2014, 17 October (as current institute); 2026, 16 July (as current university)	Kendari, Southeast Sulawesi	B	

==== Public Islamic Institutes ====
PT Code 202-	Name	Abbrev.	Founding Date	Location	Accred.	Link
020	State Islamic Institute of Manado; Institut Agama Islam Negeri Manado	IAIN Manado	1997, 30 June (as STAIN Manado); 2014, 17 October (as current institute)	Manado, North Sulawesi	Excellent	
021	State Islamic Institute of Parepare; Institut Agama Islam Negeri Parepare	IAIN Parepare	2008, 20 June (as STAIN Parepare); 2018, 5 April (as current institute)	Parepare, South Sulawesi	Very Good	
024	State Islamic Institute of Ternate; Institut Agama Islam Negeri Ternate	IAIN Ternate	1997, 21 March (as STAIN Ternate); 2013, 30 July (as current institute)	Ternate, North Maluku	B	
025	State Islamic Institute of Zawiyah Cot Kala; Institut Agama Islam Negeri Zawiyah Cot Kala	IAIN Langsa	1980, 14 October (as STAIN Langsa); 2014, 17 October (as current institute)	Langsa, Aceh	B	
030	State Islamic Institute of Pontianak; Institut Agama Islam Negeri Pontianak	IAIN Pontianak	1997, 21 March (as STAIN Pontianak); 2013, 6 August (as current institute)	Pontianak, West Kalimantan	B	
036	State Islamic Institute of Kerinci; Institut Agama Islam Negeri Kerinci	IAIN Kerinci	1997, 21 March (as STAIN Kerinci); 2016, 1 August (as current institute)	Kerinci, Jambi	Very Good	
039	State Islamic Institute of Curup; Institut Agama Islam Negeri Curup	IAIN Curup	1997, 19 September (as STAIN Curup); 2018, 5 April (as current institute)	Rejang Lebong, Bengkulu	B	
040	State Islamic Institute of Fattahul Muluk; Institut Agama Islam Negeri Fattahul Muluk	IAIN Jayapura	2006, 20 July (as STAIN Al-Fatah); 2018, 5 April (as current institute)	Jayapura, Papua	Very Good	
043	State Islamic Institute of Syaikh Abdurrahman Siddik; Institut Agama Islam Syaikh Abdurrahman Siddik	IAIN Babel	2004, 18 October (as STAIN Syaikh Abdurrahman Siddik); 2018, 5 April (as current institute)	Bangka, Bangka Belitung Islands	Good	
044	State Islamic Institute of Bone; Institut Agama Islam Negeri Bone	IAIN Bone	1997, 21 March (as STAIN Watampone); 2018, 5 April (as current institute)	Bone, South Sulawesi	B	
046	State Islamic Institute of Sorong; Institut Agama Islam Negeri Sorong	IAIN Sorong	1997, 21 March (as STAIN Sorong); 2020, 20 February (as current institute)	Sorong, West Papua	B	
047	State Islamic Institute of Takengon; Institut Agama Islam Negeri Takengon	IAIN Takengon	2012, 25 April (as STAIN Gajah Putih); 2020, 28 February (as current institute)	Central Aceh, Aceh	Good	
035	State Institite of Datuk Laksemana; Institut Agama Islam Negeri Datuk Laksemana	IAIN Bengkalis	2014, 19 September; 2025, 8 May (as current institute)	Bengkalis, Riau	Good	

==== Public Islamic Colleges ====
PT Code 203-	Name	Abbrev.	Founding Date	Location	Accred.	Link
034	State Islamic College of Teungku Dirundeng Meulaboh; Sekolah Tinggi Agama Islam Negeri Teungku Dirundeng Meulaboh	STAIN Meulaboh	2014, 19 September	West Aceh, Aceh	Very Good	
036	State Islamic College of Majene; Sekolah Tinggi Agama Islam Negeri Majene	STAIN Majene	2016, 31 August	Majene, West Sulawesi	Good	
037	State Islamic College of Mandailing Natal; Sekolah Tinggi Agama Islam Negeri Mandailing Natal	STAIN Madina	2019, 25 January	Mandailing Natal, North Sumatra		
038	State Islamic College of Sultan Abdurrahman; Sekolah Tinggi Agama Islam Negeri Sultan Abdurrahman Kepulauan Riau	STAIN Kepri	2017, 13 March	Bintan, Riau Islands	Good	

=== Public Christian higher education institutions ===
==== Public Christian Institutes ====
PT Code 222-	Name	Abbrev.	Founding Date	Location	Acred.	Link
001	State Christian Institute of Tarutung Institut Agama Kristen Negeri Tarutung	IAKN Tarutung	1 March 2018	North Sulawesi	Good	
002	State Christian Institute of Manado Institut Agama Kristen Negeri Manado	IAKN Manado	1 March 2018	North Sulawesi	Good	
003	State Christian Institute of Ambon Institut Agama Kristen Negeri Ambon	IAKN Ambon	1 March 2018	Maluku	B	
004	State Christian Institute of Toraja Institut Agama Kristen Negeri Toraja	IAKN Toraja	23 January 2020	South Sulawesi	Good	
005	State Christian Institute of Kupang Institut Agama Kristen Negeri Kupang	IAKN Kupang	23 January 2020	East Nusa Tenggara	Good	
006	State Christian Institute of Palangka Raya Institut Agama Kristen Negeri Palangka Raya	IAKN Palangka Raya	23 January 2020	Central Kalimantan		

==== Public Protestant Christian Colleges ====
PT Code 223-	Name	Abbrev.	Founding Date	Location	Acred.	Link
006	State Protestant Christian College of Sentani; Sekolah Tinggi Agama Kristen Protestan Negeri Sentani	STAKPN Sentani	10 April 2001	Papua	Good	

=== Public Catholic Colleges ===
PT Code 263-	Name	Abbrev.	Founding Date	Location	Acred.	Link
001	State Catholic College of Pontianak; Sekolah Tinggi Agama Katolik Negeri Pontianak	STAKATN Pontianak	6 April 2017	West Kalimantan	Good	

=== Public Hindu higher education institutions ===
==== Public Hindu Universities ====
PT Code 241-	Name	Abbrev.	Founding Date	Location	Acred.	Link
001	State Hindu University of I Gusti Bagus Sugriwa; Universitas Hindu Negeri I Gusti Bagus Sugriwa	UHN Sugriwara	23 January 2020	Bali	Very Good	

==== Public Hindu Institutes ====
PT Code 242-	Name	Abbrev.	Founding Date	Location	Acred.	Link
002	State Hindu Institute of Tampung Penyang; Institut Agama Hindu Negeri Tampung Penyang	IAHN TP	6 September 1986	Central Kalimantan	Good	
003	State Hindu Institute of Gde Pudja; Institut Agama Hindu Negeri Gde Pudja	IAHN Gde Pudja	11 July 2001	West Nusa Tenggara	Good	
008	State Hindu Institute of Mpu Kuturan; Institut Agama Hindu Negeri Mpu Kuturan	IAHN Mpu Kuturan	21 March 2016	Bali	Very Good	

=== Public Buddhist higher education institutions ===
==== Public Buddhist Colleges ====
PT Code 242-	Name	Abbrev.	Founding Date	Location	Acred.	Link
001	State Buddhist College of Sriwijaya; Sekolah Tinggi Agama Buddha Negeri Sriwijaya	STABN Sriwijaya	20 May 2002	Banten	B	
002	State Buddhist College of Raden Wijaya; Sekolah Tinggi Agama Buddha Negeri Raden Wijaya	STABN Raden Wijaya	25 January 2007	Central Java	B	

== Service higher education institutions ==
Service higher education institutions are higher education institution that are under the auspices of government institutions (ministries) as education providers with a civil service bond or cadreship system.

=== Ministry of Home Affairs ===
PT Code 342-	Name	Abbrev.	Founding Date	Location	Acred.	Link
001	Institute of Home Affairs; Institut Pemerintahan Dalam Negeri	IPDN	1956	West Java	Very Good	

=== Ministry of Energy and Mineral Resources ===
PT Code 355-	Name	Abbrev.	Founding Date	Location	Acred.	Link
001	Akamigas Energy and Mineral Polytechnic; Politeknik Energi dan Mineral Akamigas	PEM AKAMIGAS	1967	Central Java	B	
002	Bandung Energy and Mining Polytechnic; Politeknik Energi dan Pertambangan Bandung	PEP BANDUNG	2019	West Java	Good	

=== Ministry of Law and Human Rights ===
PT Code 365-	Name	Abbrev.	Founding Date	Location	Acred.	Link
001	Correctional Science Polytechnic; Politeknik Ilmu Pemasyarakatan	POLTEKIP	1962	West Java		
002	Immigration Polytechnic; Politeknik Imigrasi	POLTEKIM	1962	West Java		

=== Ministry of Communications and Informatics ===
PT Code 373-	Name	Abbrev.	Founding Date	Location	Acred.	Link
001	MMTC Multi Media College; Sekolah Tinggi Multi Media MMTC Yogyakarta	STMM MMTC	2014	Yogyakarta	B	

== Private universities ==
These notable private universities are owned, funded and managed by private organizations, including those affiliated with Islamic (Muhammadiyah), Catholic or Christian socio-religious organizations.

=== Sumatra ===
==== Aceh ====
Name in English	Name in Indonesian	Acronym	Foundation	Location	Link
Almuslim University	Universitas Al Muslim Peusangan	UMUSLIM	2003	Bireuen	
University of Bina Bangsa Getsempena	Universitas Bina Bangsa Getsempena	UBBG	2021	Banda Aceh	

==== Riau ====
Name in English	Name in Indonesian	Acronym	Foundation	Location	Link
Nurul Hidayah Islamic College	Sekolah Tinggi Agama Islam Nurul Hidayah	STAI	2000	Selat Panjang	
Lancang Kuning University	Universitas Lancang Kuning	UNILAK	1982	Pekanbaru	
Abdurrab University	Universitas Abdurrab	UNIVRAB	2005	Pekanbaru	
Islamic University of Riau	Universitas Islam Riau	UIR	1962	Pekanbaru	
Awal Bros University	Universitas Awal Bros	UAB	2009	Pekanbaru	
Muhammadiyah University of Riau	Universitas Muhammadiyah Riau	UMRI	2008	Pekanbaru	
Persada Bunda Indonesia University	Universitas Persada Bunda Indonesia	UPBI	1991	Pekanbaru	
Rokania University	Universitas Rokania	ROKANIA	2023	Rokan Hulu	

==== Riau Islands ====
Name in English	Name in Indonesian	Acronym	Foundation	Location	Link
Batam University	Universitas Batam	UNIBA	2000	Batam	
Ibnu Sina University	Universitas Ibnu Sina	UIS	2019	Batam	
International University of Batam	Universitas Internasional Batam	UIB	2000	Batam	

==== North Sumatra ====
Name in English	Name in Indonesian	Acronym	Foundation	Location	Link
HKBP Nommensen University	Universitas HKBP Nommensen	UHN	1954	Medan	
Islamic University of North Sumatra	Universitas Islam Sumatera Utara	UISU	1953	Medan	
Methodist University of Indonesia	Universitas Methodist Indonesia	UMI	1965	Medan	
Royal College of Information and Computer Management	Sekolah Tinggi Manajemen Informatika dan Komputer Royal	STMIK Royal	1995	Kisaran	

==== Bangka Belitung ====
Name in English	Name in Indonesian	Acronym	Foundation	Location	Link
Muhammadiyah University of Bangka Belitung	Universitas Muhammadiyah Bangka Belitung	UNMUH BABEL		Pangkalpinang	

==== West Sumatra ====
Name in English	Name in Indonesian	Acronym	Foundation	Location	Link
National Teacher Training and Education College	Sekolah Tinggi Keguruan Dan Ilmu Pendidikan Nasional	STKIP	2009	Padang Pariaman	

==== Jambi ====
Name in English	Name in Indonesian	Acronym	Foundation	Location	Link
Adiwangsa Jambi University	Universitas Adiwangsa Jambi	UNAJA	2017	Jambi	
Muhammadiyah University of Jambi	Universitas Muhammadiyah Jambi	UM Jambi	1993	Jambi	

==== Bengkulu ====
Name in English	Name in Indonesian	Acronym	Foundation	Location	Link
Muhammadiyah University of Bengkulu	Universitas Muhammadiyah Bengkulu	UMB	1970	Bengkulu	

==== South Sumatra ====
Name in English	Name in Indonesian	Acronym	Foundation	Location	Link
Muhammadiyah University of Palembang	Universitas Muhammadiyah Palembang	UMP	1984	Palembang	
University of Palembang	Universitas Palembang	UNPAL	1982	Palembang	

==== Lampung ====
Name in English	Name in Indonesian	Acronym	Foundation	Location	Link
Indonesia Technocrat University	Universitas Teknokrat Indonesia		1986	Bandar Lampung	
Muhammadiyah University of Metro	Universitas Muhammadiyah Metro	UM Metro	1991	Metro, Indonesia	
Raden Intan Lampung State Islamic University	Universitas Islam Negeri Raden Intan Lampung	UINRIL	1968	Bandar Lampung	

=== Java ===
==== Jakarta ====
Name in English	Name in Indonesian	Acronym	Foundation	Reference	Website
Al-Azhar University of Indonesia	Universitas Al-Azhar Indonesia	UAI	1960		www.uai.ac.id
Asian Banking Finance and Informatic Institute Perbanas	STIE Perbanas	ABFI-PERBANAS	1969		www.perbanasinstitute.ac.id
Atma Jaya Catholic University of Indonesia	Universitas Katolik Atma Jaya	STMIK Jakarta STI&K	1960		www.atmajaya.ac.id
Bakrie University	Universitas Bakrie	UB	2006		www.bakrie.ac.id
Bina Nusantara University	Universitas Bina Nusantara	Binus University	1985		www.binus.ac.id
Bina Sarana Informatika University	Universitas Bina Sarana Informatika	UBSI	1988		www.bsi.ac.id
Borobudur University	Universitas Borobudur		1982		www.universitasborobudur.ac.id
Budi Luhur University	Universitas Budi Luhur	UBL	1979		www.budiluhur.ac.id
Bung Karno University	Universitas Bung Karno	UBK	1999		www.ubk.ac.id
Bhayangkara University of Jakarta	Universitas Bhayangkara Jakarta	Ubharajaya	1985		ubharajaya.ac.id
Christian University of Indonesia	Universitas Kristen Indonesia	UKI	1953		www.uki.ac.id
Darma Persada University	Universitas Darma Persada	UNSADA	1986		www.unsada.ac.id
Dian Nusantara University	Universitas Dian Nusantara	UNDIRA	2019		undira.ac.id
Esa Unggul University	Universitas Esa Unggul	UEU	1993		www.esaunggul.ac.id
Forward Indonesia University	Universitas Indonesia Maju	UIMA	2022		uima.ac.id
Ibnu Chaldun University	Universitas Ibnu Chaldun	UIC	1956		uic.ac.id
Indonesia Institute for Life Science	Institut Bio Scientia Internasional Indonesia	i3L	2013		www.i3l.ac.id
Indonesia Islamic Hospital Foundation University	Universitas Yayasan Rumah Sakit Islam Indonesia	YARSI	1967		www.yarsi.ac.id
Indraprasta PGRI University	Universitas Indraprasta PGRI	UNINDRA	1982		www.unindra.ac.id
Informatics Management and Computer University of Jakarta	Sekolah Tinggi Manajemen Informatika dan Komputer Jakarta	STMIK	2000		www.jak-stik.ac.id
Jakarta Institute of Arts	Institut Kesenian Jakarta	IKJ	1970		www.ikj.ac.id
Jakarta University	Universitas Jakarta	UNIJA	1964		www.universitasjakarta.ac.id
Tanri Abeng University	Universitas Tanri Abeng	TAU	2011		tau.ac.id
Telkom University Jakarta	Universitas Telkom Jakarta	Tel-U	2023		jakarta.telkomuniversity.ac.id
Kalbis University	Universitas Kalbis	KALBIS	1992		kalbis.ac.id
Krida Wacana Christian University	Universitas Kristen Krida Wacana	UKRIDA	1967		www.ukrida.ac.id
Krisnadwipayana University	Universitas Krisnadwipayana	UKRIS	1952		unkris.ac.id
Kwik Kian Gie Institute of Business and Informatics	Institut Bisnis dan Informatika Kwik Kian Gie	IBIKKG	1987		kwikkiangie.ac.id
Mercu Buana University	Universitas Mercubuana	UMB	1985		www.mercubuana.ac.id
Mpu Tantular University	Universitas Mpu Tantular	UMT	1984		mputantular.ac.id
Muhammadiyah University of Jakarta	Universitas Muhammadiyah Jakarta	UMJ	1955		www.umj.ac.id
MNC University	Universitas MNC	UMNC	2021		umnci.ac.id
National University	Universitas Nasional	UNAS	1949		www.unas.ac.id
Nusantara Institute of Business	Institut Bisnis Nusantara	IBN	1986		www.ibn.ac.id
Pancasila University	Universitas Pancasila	UP	1966		www.univpancasila.ac.id
Paramadina University	Universitas Paramadina	UPM/PARMAD	1998		www.paramadina.ac.id
Persada Indonesia - Indonesia Administration Foundation University	Universitas Persada Indonesia Yayasan Administrasi Indonesia	UPI YAI	1985		www.yai.ac.id
Podomoro University	Universitas Podomoro	UP	2014		podomorouniversity.ac.id
PPM School of Management	Pendidikan dan Pembinaan Manajemen	PPM	1967		ppm-manajemen.ac.id
Prof. Dr. HAMKA Muhammadiyah University	Universitas Muhammadiyah Prof. Dr. HAMKA	UHAMKA	1960		www.uhamka.ac.id
Prof. Moestopo University	Universitas Prof. Moestopo (Beragama)	UPDM(B)	1961		www.moestopo.ac.id
Raffles Institute of Higher Education	Raffles Institute of Higher Education	Raffles@Citywalk	2009		
Respati University of Indonesia	Universitas Respati Indonesia	URINDO	1978		www.urindo.ac.id
Satyagama University	Universitas Satyagama	US	1988		universitassatyagama.smartcampus.co.id/tentang
Sahid University	Universitas Sahid	USAHID	1988		usahid.ac.id
Sampoerna University	Universitas Sampoerna	SU	2013		www.sampoernauniversity.ac.id
Muhammadiyah Science and Technology University	Universitas Saintek Muhammadiya	Saintekmu	2022		saintekmu.ac.id
Satya Negara University	Universitas Satya Negara	USNI	1987		usni.ac.id/home.php
Tarumanagara University	Universitas Tarumanagara	UNTAR	1962		
Trisakti University	Universitas Trisakti	USAKTI	1965		www.trisakti.ac.id
University of Bunda Mulia	Universitas Bunda Mulia	UBM	1986		www.ubm.ac.id

==== Banten ====
Name in English	Name in Indonesian	Acronym	Foundation	Location	Link
BINUS University Alam Sutera Main Campus	Universitas Bina Nusantara Kampus Alam Sutera	BINUS	2010	Tangerang	
Buddhi Dharma University	Universitas Buddhi Dharma	UBD	1995	Tangerang	
International University Liaison Indonesia	Universitas Lintas Internasional Indonesia	IULI	2014	Tangerang	
Multimedia Nusantara University	Universitas Media Nusantara	UNIMEDIA	2006	Gading Tangerang	
Pamulang University	Universitas Pamulang	UNPAM	2000	South Tangerang	
Pelita Harapan University	Universitas Pelita Harapan	UPH	1993	Karawaci, Tangerang	
Perguruan Tinggi Raharja	Perguruan Tinggi Raharja Tangerang	RAHARJA	1994	Tangerang	
Prasetiya Mulya University	Universitas Prasetiya Mulya	PMBS, Prasmul, PMSBE	1982	South Tangerang and Jakarta	
Serang Raya University	Universitas Serang Raya	UNSERA	2001	Serang	
Surya University	Universitas Surya	SU	2013	Tangerang	
Swiss German University	Swiss German University	SGU	2000	South Tangerang	
Syech Yusuf Islamic University of Tangerang	Universitas Islam Syekh Yusuf Tangerang	UNIS	1966	Tangerang	
Technology Institute of Indonesia	Institut Teknologi Indonesia	ITI	1984	Tangerang	
Multimedia Nusantara Polytechnic	Politeknik Multimedia Nusantara	MNP	2021	Tangerang	

==== West Java ====
Name in English	Name in Indonesian	Acronym	Foundation	Location	Link
Bandung Islamic University	Universitas Islam Bandung	UNISBA	1958	Bandung	
Bina Insani University	Universitas Bina Insani		2019	Bekasi	
Djuanda University	Universitas Djuanda	UNIDA	1987	Bogor	
Gunadarma University	Universitas Gunadarma	GUNDAR	1981	Depok	
Harapan Bangsa Institute of Technology	Institut Teknologi Harapan Bangsa	ITHB	2002	Bandung	
Horizon University Indonesia	Universitas Horizon Indonesia	HORIZONU	1991	Karawang	
Ibn Khaldun University	Universitas Ibn Khaldun Bogor	UIKA	1961	Bogor	
Indonesian Computer University	Universitas Komputer Indonesia	UNIKOM	2001	Bandung	
Jayabaya University	Universitas Jayabaya	UJ	1958	Bogor	
General Achmad Yani University	Universitas Jenderal Achmad Yani	UNJANI	1974	Cimahi	
Islamic University 45	Universitas Islam 45	UNISMA	1982	Bekasi	
Langlangbuana University	Universitas Langlangbuana	UNLA	1982	Bandung	
Majalengka University	Universitas Majalengka	UM	2006	Majalengka	
Maranatha Christian University	Universitas Kristen Maranatha	UKM	1965	Bandung	
National Institute of Technology	Institut Teknologi Nasional	ITENAS	1972	Bandung	
Nusantara Islamic University	Universitas Islam Nusantara	UNINUS	1959	Bandung	
Pakuan University	Universitas Pakuan	UNPAK	1980	Bogor	
Panca Sakti University	Universitas Panca Sakti	UPS	2020	Bekasi	
Parahyangan Catholic University	Universitas Katolik Parahyangan	UNPAR	1955	Bandung	
Pasundan University	Universitas Pasundan	UNPAS	1960	Bandung	
President University	Universitas Presiden	PresUniv	2001	Bekasi	
Technology College of Garut	Sekolah Tinggi Teknologi Garut	STTG	1991	Garut	
Telkom University	Telkom University	Tel-U	2013	Bandung	
Universitas Kuningan	Universitas Kuningan	UNIKU	2003	Kuningan	
Widyatama University	Universitas Widyatama	Widyatama	1973	Bandung	
Kesatuan Institute of Business and Informatics	Institut Bisnis dan Informatika Kesatuan	IBIK	1953	Bogor	
PASIM National University	Universitas Nasional PASIM	UNAS PASIM	1996	Bandung	
Sanata Dharma University	Universitas Sanata Dharma	USD	1955	Depok	
Sony Sugema College of Information Technology	Sekolah Tinggi Teknologi Informatika Sony Sugema	STTI	2001	Bandung	
Subang University	Universitas Subang	UNSUB	1982	Subang	
YPIB Majalengka University	Universitas YPIB Majalengka	Univypib	2022	Majalengka	

==== Yogyakarta Special Region ====
Name in English	Name in Indonesian	Acronym	Foundation	Location	Link
Ahmad Dahlan University	Universitas Ahmad Dahlan	UAD	1960	Yogyakarta	
AKPRIND Institute of Science and Technology	Institut Sains dan Teknologi AKPRIND	IST AKPRIND	1970	Yogyakarta	
Atma Jaya University, Yogyakarta	Universitas Atmajaya Yogyakarta	UAJY	1965	Yogyakarta	
College of Information Management and Computer Science AMIKOM Yogyakarta	STMIK AMIKOM Yogyakarta	AMIKOM	1992	Yogyakarta	
Duta Wacana Christian University	Universitas Kristen Duta Wacana	UKDW	1945	Yogyakarta	
Islamic University of Indonesia	Universitas Islam Indonesia	UII	1945	Yogyakarta	
Mercu Buana University, Yogyakarta	Universitas Mercubuana Yogyakarta	UMBY	1985	Yogyakarta	
Muhammadiyah University of Yogyakarta	Universitas Muhammadiyah Yogyakarta	UMY	1980	Yogyakarta	
Sanata Dharma University	Universitas Sanata Dharma	USD	1955	Yogyakarta	
Aisyiyah University	Universitas Aisyiyah	UNISA	1991	Yogyakarta	
Yogyakarta University of Technology	Universitas Teknologi Yogyakarta	UTY	2002	Sleman	
General Achmad Yani University of Yogyakarta	Universitas Jenderal Achmad Yani Yogyakarta	UNJAYA	2018	Sleman	

==== Central Java ====
Name in English	Name in Indonesian	Acronym	Foundation	Location	Link
Academy of Information and Computer Management PGRI	Akademi Manajemen Informatika dan Komputer PGRI	AMIK PGRI	1993	Kebumen	
University of Computer Science & Technology	Universitas Sains & Teknologi Komputer	Univ STEKOM	2020	Semarang	
Amikom University of Purwokerto	Universitas Amikom Purwokerto	AMPU	2005	Purwokerto	Link
ATMI Polytechnic	Politeknik ATMI	ATMI	1968	Surakarta	
Dharma Patria Polytechnic	Politeknik Dharma Patria	POLDA	2002	Kebumen	
Dian Nuswantoro University	Universitas Dian Nuswantoro	UDINUS	2001	Semarang	
Muhammadiyah Institute of Technology	Sekolah Tinggi Teknologi Muhammadiyah	STTM	2001	Kebumen	
Muhammadiyah University of Magelang	Universitas Muhammadiyah Magelang	UMMGL	1964	Magelang	
Muhammadiyah University of Purwokerto	Universitas Muhammadiyah Purwoketo	UMP	1964	Purwokerto	
Muhammadiyah University of Purworejo	Universitas Muhammadiyah Purworejo	UMP	1964	Purworejo	
Muhammadiyah University of Semarang	Universitas Muhammadiyah Semarang	UNIMUS	1997	Semarang	
Muhammadiyah University of Surakarta	Universitas Muhammadiyah Surakarta	UMS	1960	Surakarta	
Muria Kudus University	Universitas Muria Kudus	UMK	1982	Kudus	
Nahdlatul Ulama Islamic Institute	Institut Agama Islam Nahdlatul Ulama	IAINU	1987	Kebumen	
Nahdlatul Ulama Islamic University	Universitas Islam Nahdlatul Ulama	UNISNU	1991	Jepara	
Nahdlatul Ulama Ma'arif University	Universitas Ma'arif Nahdlatul Ulama	UMNU	2014	Kebumen	
Putra Bangsa University	Universitas Putra Bangsa	UPB	2001	Kebumen	
Qur'anic Science University	Universitas Sains Al Qur'an	UNSIQ	1988	Wonosobo	
Satya Wacana Christian University	Universitas Kristen Satya Wacana	UKSW	1956	Salatiga	
Soegijapranata Catholic University	Universitas Katolik Soegijapranata	UNIKA	1964	Semarang	
Stikubank University	Universitas Stikubank	UNISBANK	2001	Semarang	
Sultan Agung Islamic University	Universitas Islam Sultan Agung	UNISSULA	1962	Semarang	Link
Surakarta University	Universitas Surakarta	UNSA	1995	Surakarta	
Widya Dharma University	Universitas Widya Dharma	UNWIDHA	1969	Klaten	

==== East Java ====
Name in English	Name in Indonesian	Acronym	Foundation	Location	Link
17 August 1945 University Surabaya	Universitas 17 Agustus 1945 Surabaya	UNTAG	1958	Surabaya	
Bina Nusantara University Malang	Universitas Bina Nusantara Malang	BINUS Malang	2015	Malang	
Ciputra University	Universitas Ciputra	UC	2006	Surabaya	
Institute of Health Education	Institut Ilmu Kesehatan	IIK	1985	Kediri	
Kertanegara University	Sekolah Tinggi Ilmu ekonomi Kertanegara Malang	STIEKMA	1982	Malang	
Merdeka University Malang	Universitas Merdeka Malang	UNMER	1964	Malang	
Muhammadiyah University of Gresik	Universitas Muhammadiyah Gresik	UMG	1987	Gresik	
Muhammadiyah University of Jember	Universitas Muhammadiyah Jember	Unmuh Jember	1987	Jember	
Muhammadiyah University of Malang	Universitas Muhammadiyah Malang	UMM	1964	Malang	
Muhammadiyah University of Sidoarjo	Universitas Muhammadiyah Sidoarjo	UMSIDA	1987	Sidoarjo	
Muhammadiyah University of Surabaya	Universitas Muhammadiyah Surabaya	Unmuh Surabaya	1964	Surabaya	
Pelita Harapan University	Universitas Pelita Harapan	UPH	1993	Surabaya	
Petra Christian University	Universitas Kristen Petra	PCU	1961	Surabaya	
University of Surabaya	Universitas Surabaya	UBAYA	1966	Surabaya	
Widya Mandala Catholic University	Universitas Katolik Widya Mandala	UKWMS / WM	1960	Surabaya	
Wijaya Kusuma University, Surabaya	Universitas Wijaya Kusuma Surabaya	UWK	1980	Surabaya	
Wijaya Putra University	Universitas Wijaya Putra	UWP	1981	Surabaya	
Telkom University Surabaya	Universitas Telkom Surabaya	Tel-U	2023	Surabaya	
Kiai Haji Achmad Siddiq State Islamic University Jember	Universitas Islam Negeri Kiai Haji Achmad Siddiq Jember	UINKHAS	1997	Jember	
PGRI MADIUN University	Universitas PGRI MADIUN	UNIPMA	1976	Madiun	

=== Kalimantan ===
==== West Kalimantan ====
Name in English	Name in Indonesian	Acronym	Foundation	Location	Link
Widya Dharma School of Information Management and Computer	Sekolah Tinggi Manajemen Informatika dan Komputer Widya Dharma	STMIK Widya Dharma	2007	Pontianak	
University of Kapuas Sintang	Universitas Kapuas Sintang	UNKA	1992	Sintang	
Panca Bhakti University	Universitas Panca Bhakti	UPB	1991	Pontianak	

==== Central Kalimantan ====
Name in English	Name in Indonesian	Acronym	Foundation	Location	Link
Palangka Raya Christian University	Universitas Kristen Palangka Raya	UKPR	1987	Palangkaraya	
Darwan Ali University	Universitas Darwan Ali	UNDA	2008	Sampit	
Antakusuma University	Universitas Antakusuma	UNTAMA	2003	Pangkalan Bun	

==== South Kalimantan ====
Name in English	Name in Indonesian	Acronym	Foundation	Location	Link
Achmad Yani University	Universitas Achmad Yani	UAY	1983	Banjarmasin	
Borneo Lestari University	Universitas Borneo Lestari	UNBL	2013	Banjarbaru	

==== East Kalimantan ====
Name in English	Name in Indonesian	Acronym	Foundation	Location	Link
17 August 1945 University Samarinda	Universitas 17 Agustus 1945 Samarinda	UNTAG	1963	Samarinda	
University of Widya Gama Mahakam Samarinda	Universitas Widya Gama Mahakam Samarinda	UWGM	1985	Samarinda	
Muhammadiyah University Of East kalimantan	Universitas Muhammadiyah Kalimantan Timur	UMKT	2017	Samarinda	

==== North Kalimantan ====
Name in English	Name in Indonesian	Acronym	Foundation	Location	Link
Kaltara University	Universitas Kaltara	UNIKALTAR	2008	Bulungan	

=== Sulawesi ===
==== North Sulawesi ====
Name in English	Name in Indonesian	Acronym	Foundation	Location	Link
De La Salle Catholic University	Universitas Katolik De La Salle Manado		2000	Manado	
Klabat University	Universitas Klabat		1965	Manado	

==== Gorontalo ====
Name in English	Name in Indonesian	Acronym	Foundation	Location	Link
Nahdlatul Ulama University of Gorontalo	Universitas Nahdlatul Ulama Gorontalo	UNUGO	2019	Gorontalo	
Bina Taruna University of Gorontalo	Universitas Bina Taruna Gorontalo	UNBITA	2021	Gorontalo	

==== West Sulawesi ====
Name in English	Name in Indonesian	Acronym	Foundation	Location	Link
Al Asyariah Mandar University	Universitas Al Asyariah Mandar	UNASMAN	1975	Polewali Mandar	

==== Central Sulawesi ====
Name in English	Name in Indonesian	Acronym	Foundation	Location	Link
Alkhairaat University	Universitas Alkhairaat	UNISPALU	1964	Palu	

==== Southeast Sulawesi ====
Name in English	Name in Indonesian	Acronym	Foundation	Location	Link
Avicenna College of Health Sciences	Sekolah Tinggi Ilmu Kesehatan Avicenna	STIK Avicenna	1965	Kendari	

==== South Sulawesi ====
Name in English	Name in Indonesian	Acronym	Foundation	Location	Link
Christian University of Indonesia, Toraja	Universitas Kristen Indonesia, Toraja	UKIT	1992	Tana Toraja	
East Indonesia University	Universitas Indonesia Timur	UIT	2001	Makassar	
Fajar University	Universitas Fajar	UNIFA	2008	Makassar	
Indonesia Education Board Management College	Sekolah Tinggi Ilmu Manajemen Lembaga Pendidikan Indonesia	STIM LPI	1980	Makassar	
Indonesian Muslim University Makassar	Universitas Muslim Indonesia Makassar	UMI	1954	Makassar	
Muhammadiyah University Makassar	Universitas Muhammadiyah Makassar	UNISMUH	1963	Makassar	
Republic of Indonesia Veteran University	Universitas Veteran Republik Indonesia	UVRI	1977	Makassar	
Sawerigading University	Universitas Sawerigading	UNSA Makassar	1950	Makassar	unsamakassar.ac.id

=== Lesser Sunda Islands ===
==== Bali ====
Name in English	Name in Indonesian	Acronym	Foundation	Location	Link
Bali Dwipa University	Universitas Bali Dwipa	UBP	2018	Denpasar	
Bali Institute of Design and Business	Institut Desain dan Bisnis Bali	IDB	2013	Denpasar	
Bali International University	Universitas Bali Internasional	UNBI	2015	Denpasar	
Dhyana Putra University	Universitas Dhyana Putra	Undhira	2011	Badung	
Dwijendra University	Universitas Dwijendra	Undwi	1982	Denpasar	
Hindu University of Indonesia	Universitas Hindu Indonesia	UNHI	1963	Denpasar	
Indonesia Institute of Business and Technology	Institut Bisnis dan Teknologi Indonesia	Instiki	2008	Denpasar	
Ngurah Rai University	Universitas Ngurah Rai	UNR	1979	Denpasar	
Mahasaraswati University	Universitas Mahasaraswati	UNMAS	1963	Denpasar	
Mahendradatta University	Universitas Mahendradatta	UMHD	1963	Denpasar	
Panjisakti University	Universitas Panjisakti	UNIPAS	1985	Singaraja	
PGRI Mahadewa University	Universitas PGRI Mahadewa Indonesia	UPMI	2020	Badung	
PIB College	Politeknik Internasional Bali	PIB	2017	Tabanan	
Primakara University	Universitas Primakara	PRIME-U	2013	Denpasar	
Stikom Bali Institute of Technology and Business	Institut Teknologi dan Bisnis Stikom Bali	ITB STIKOM	2002	Denpasar	
Triatma Mulya University	Universitas Triatma Mulya	UNTRIM	1999	Badung	
Tabanan University	Universitas Tabanan	UT	1999	Tabanan	
University of National Education	Universitas Pendidikan Nasional	UNDIKNAS	1969	Denpasar	
Warmadewa University	Universitas Warmadewa	UNWAR	1983	Denpasar	

==== East Nusa Tenggara ====
Name in English	Name in Indonesian	Acronym	Foundation	Location	Link
Artha Wacana Christian University	Universitas Kristen Artha Wacana	UKAW	1985	Kupang	
San Pedro University	Universitas San Pedro	USP	2016	Kupang	

==== West Nusa Tenggara ====
Name in English	Name in Indonesian	Acronym	Foundation	Location	Link
45 Mataram University	Universitas 45 Mataram	UPATMA	1982	Mataram	
Bumigora University	Universitas Bumigora	UBG	1987	Mataram	
Gunung Rinjani University	Universitas Gunung Rinjani	UGR	1996	Lombok	
Muhammadiyah University of Mataram	Universitas Muhammadiyah Mataram	UMMAT	1980	Mataram	
University of Nahdlatul Wathan Mataram	Universitas Nahdlatul Wathan Mataram	UNW	1980	Mataram	
Samawa University	Universitas Samawa	UNSA	1997	Sumbawa Besar	
Sumbawa University of Technology	Universitas Teknologi Sumbawa	UTS	2013	Sumbawa	
Mandalika Educational University	Universitas Pendidikan Mandalika	UNDIKMA	1968	Mataram	

=== Maluku Islands ===
==== Maluku ====
Name in English	Name in Indonesian	Acronym	Foundation	Location	Link
Indonesian Christian University of Maluku	Universitas Kristen Indonesia Maluku	UKIM	1985	Ambon	
Muhammadiyah University of Maluku	Universitas Muhammadiyah Maluku	UNIMKU	2020	Ambon	

==== North Maluku ====
Name in English	Name in Indonesian	Acronym	Foundation	Location	Link
Nurul Hasan Bacan University	Universitas Nurul Hasan Bacan	UNSAN	2023	South Halmahera	
Muhammadiyah University of North Maluku	Universitas Muhammadiyah Maluku Utara	UMMU	2001	Ternate	

=== Papua ===
==== Papua Province ====
Name in English	Name in Indonesian	Acronym	Foundation	Location	Link
Jayapura University of Science and Technology	Universitas Sains Dan Teknologi Jayapura	USTJ	1985	Jayapura	
Yapis Papua University	Universitas Yapis Papua	UNIYAP	2004	Jayapura	

==== West Papua ====
Name in English	Name in Indonesian	Acronym	Foundation	Location	Link
Theological College of the Indonesian Protestant Church of Papua	Sekolah Tinggi Teologia Gereja Protestan Indonesia Papua	STT GPI Papua		Fakfak	

==== Southwest Papua ====
Name in English	Name in Indonesian	Acronym	Foundation	Location	Link
Muhammadiyah STKIP of Sorong	STKIP Muhammadiyah Sorong	STKIP Muh Sorong	2004	Sorong	

==== Highland Papua ====
Name in English	Name in Indonesian	Acronym	Foundation	Location	Link
Baliem Papua University	Universitas Baliem Papua	UNIBA Papua	2023	Jayawijaya	
Amal Ilmiah Yapis University	Universitas Amal Ilmiah Yapis	UNAIM	2020	Jayawijaya	

==== South Papua ====
Name in English	Name in Indonesian	Acronym	Foundation	Location	Link
Yasanto Agricultural Polytechnic	Politeknik Pertanian Yasanto	POLITANIA	2004	Merauke	

==== Central Papua ====
Name in English	Name in Indonesian	Acronym	Foundation	Location	Link
Timika University	Universitas Timika	UTI	2006	Mimika	

== Foreign higher education institutions ==
Following the enactment of the Minister of Education, Research and Technology's Act number 53/2018, Indonesia has allowed the foreign higher education institutions to establish campuses, offer programs, and confer degrees in Indonesia. These campuses can act as distance-learning centers, or be fully-fledged universities. These include:

=== Bali ===
Name	Founding Year	Location	Link
Tsinghua University Southeast Asia Center	2022	Denpasar, Bali	

=== Banten ===
Name	Founding Year	Location	Link
Monash University, Indonesia	2020	BSD City, South Tangerang	
Universiti Kebangsaan Malaysia - Indonesia	2024	Pantai Indah Kapuk (PIK), Tangerang	

=== Jakarta Special Administrative Region ===
Name	Founding Year	Location	Link
Georgetown SFS Asia-Pacific	2023	Jakarta	

=== West Java ===
Name	Founding Year	Location	Link
Deakin University - Lancaster University Indonesia (DLI)	2024	Bandung City, West Java	

=== East Java ===
Name in English	Founding Year	Location	Link
Western Sydney University Indonesia	2024	Surabaya, East Java	
King's College London, Singhasari	2025	Singhasari SEZ, East Java	

== Other institutions ==
Institutions of higher education regulated by Indonesia's Ministry of National Education that are authorized to confer degrees, but without the status of universities include:

- Astra Manufacturing Polytechnic (Polman), Jakarta
- Indonesian State College of Accountancy (STAN), South Tangerang

== Image gallery ==
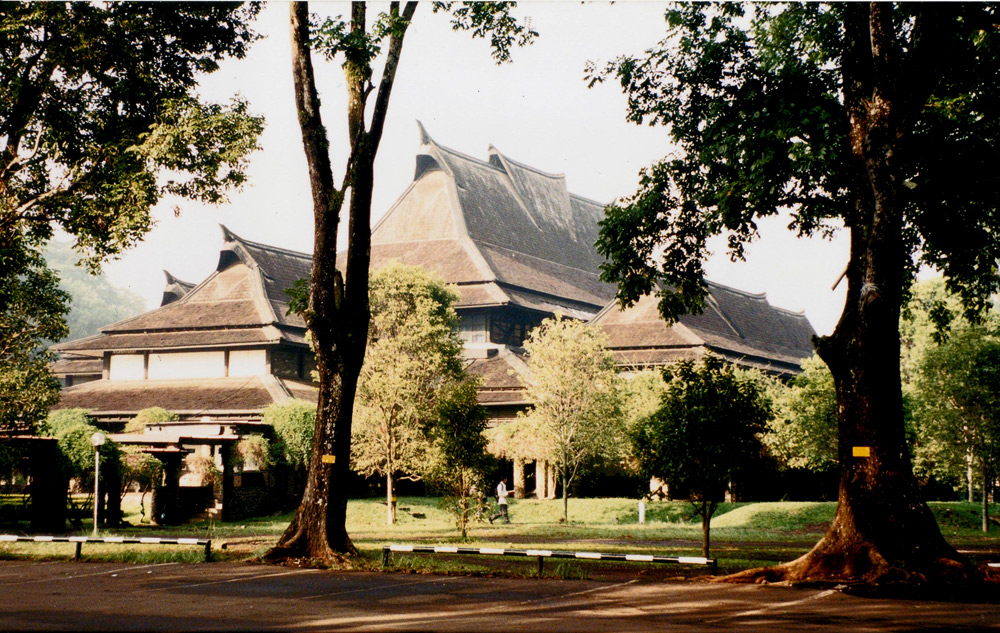
Bandung Institute of Technology, Bandung

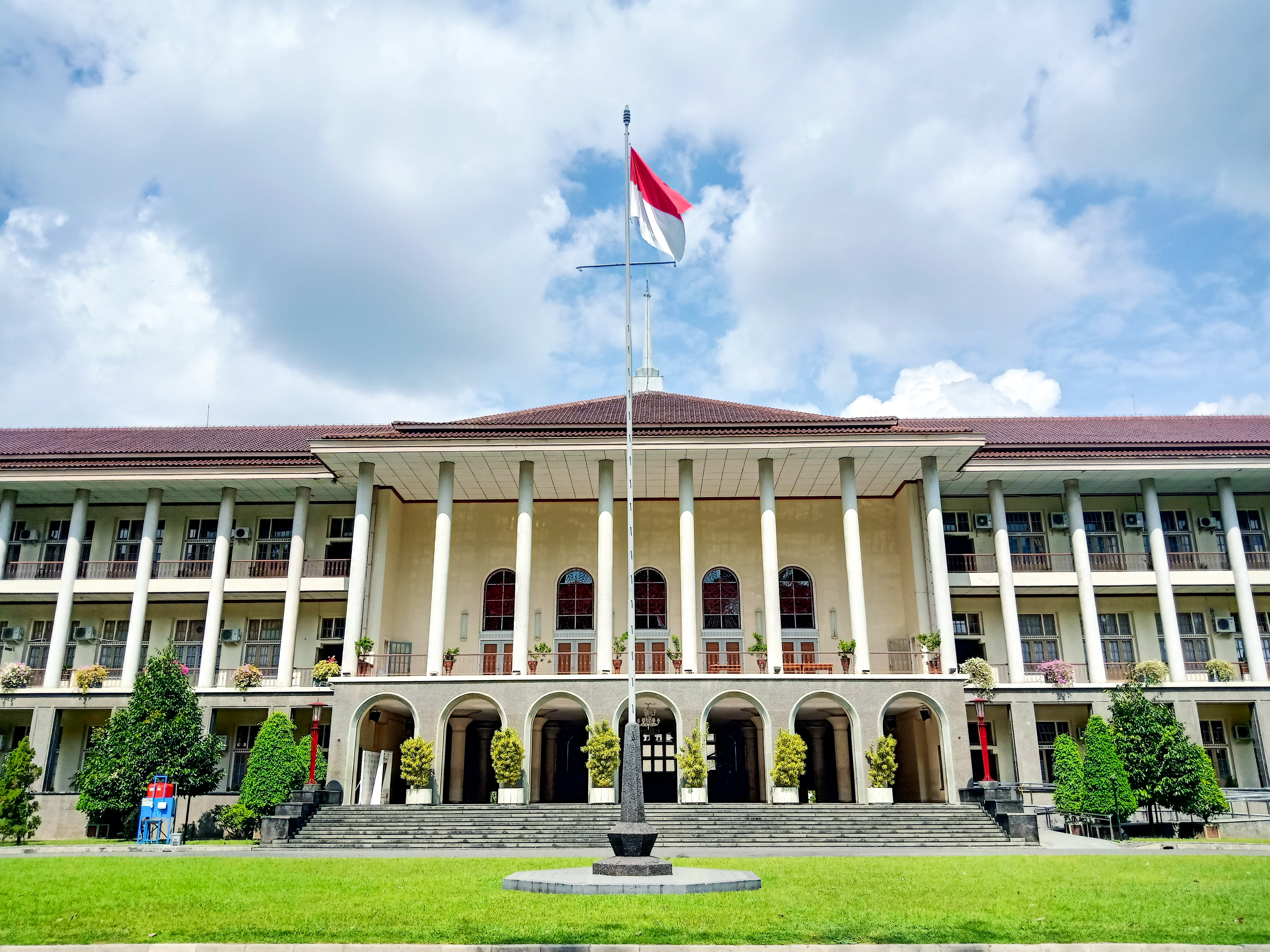
Gadjah Mada University, Yogyakarta

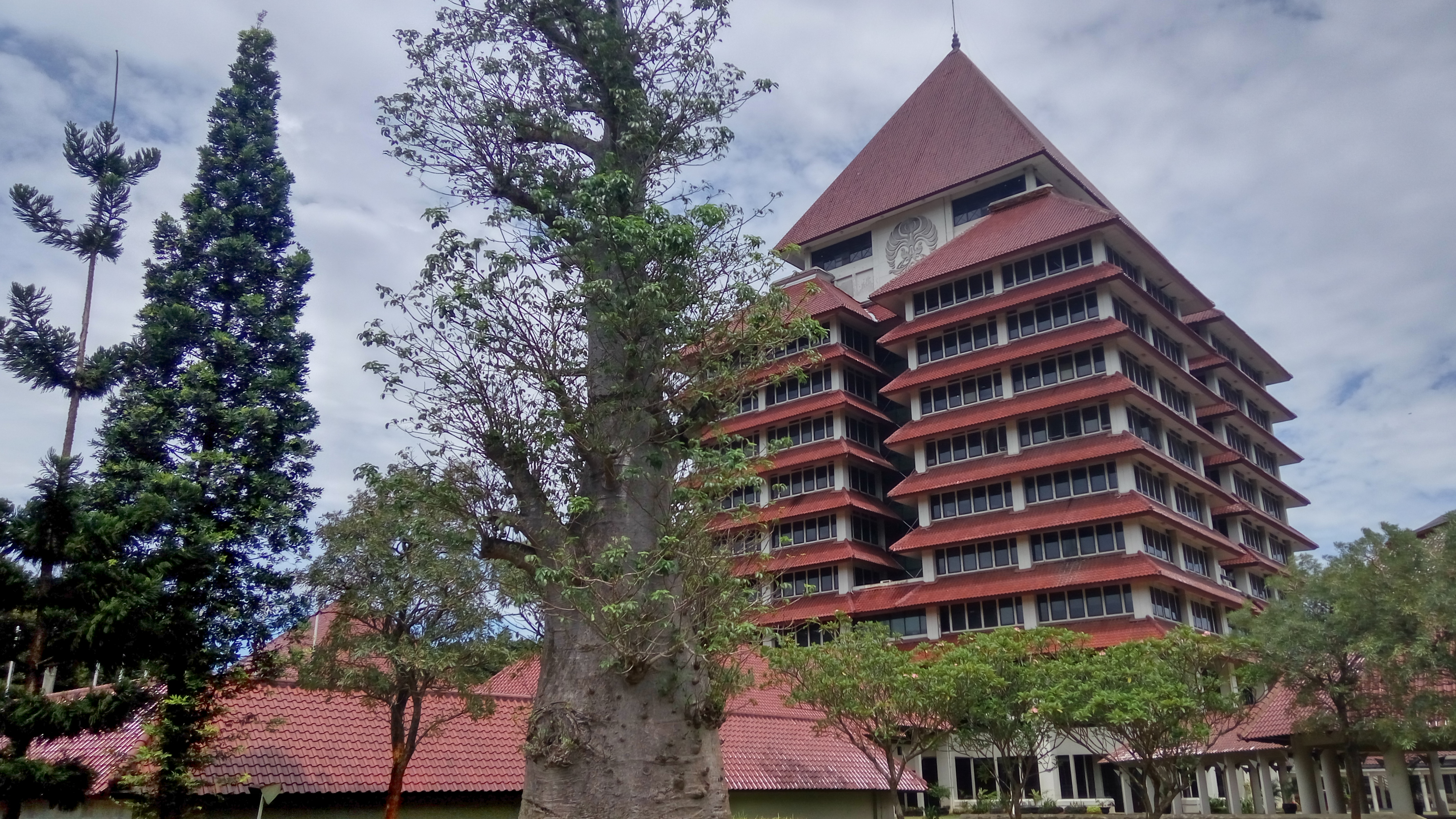
University of Indonesia, Jakarta

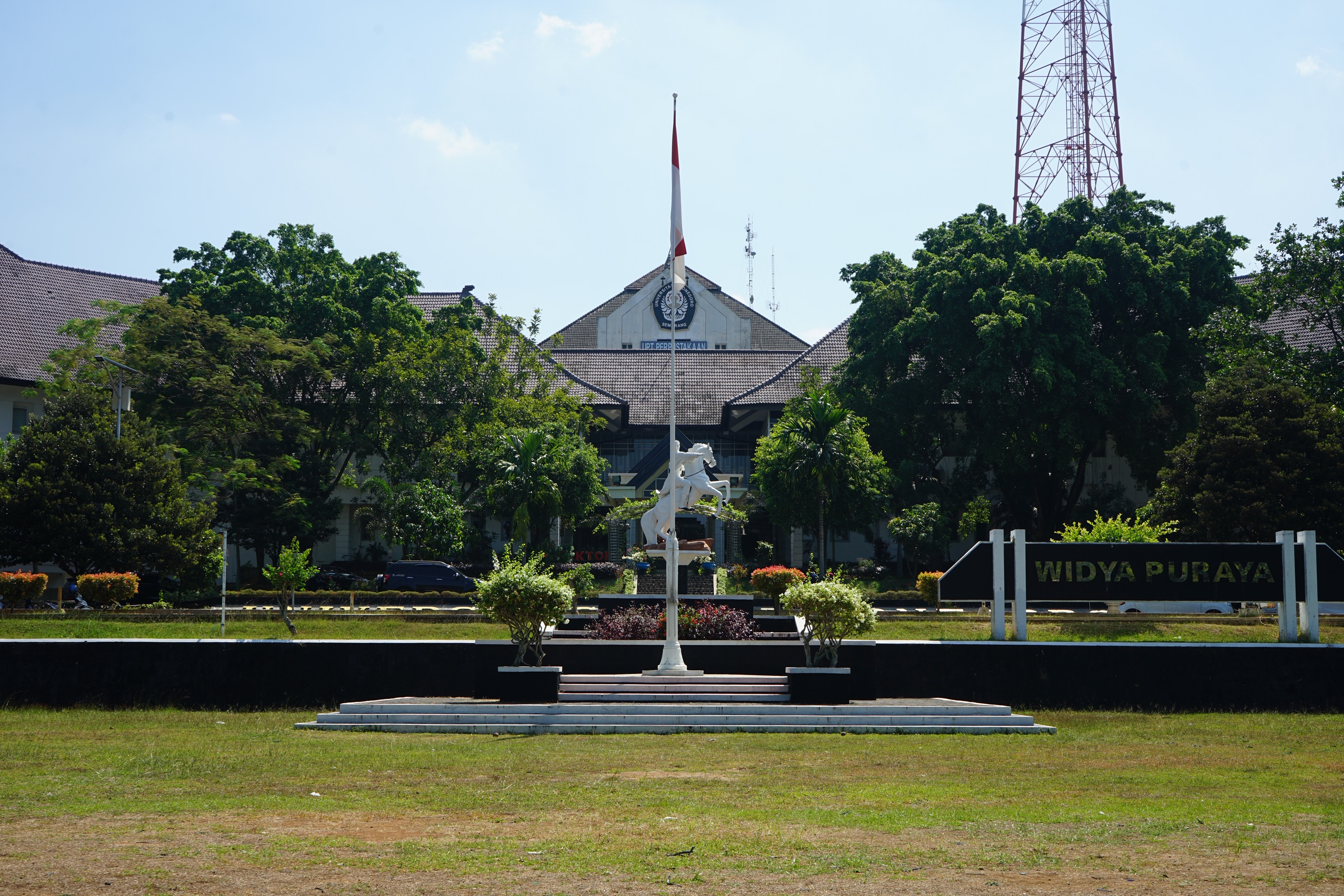
Diponegoro University, Semarang

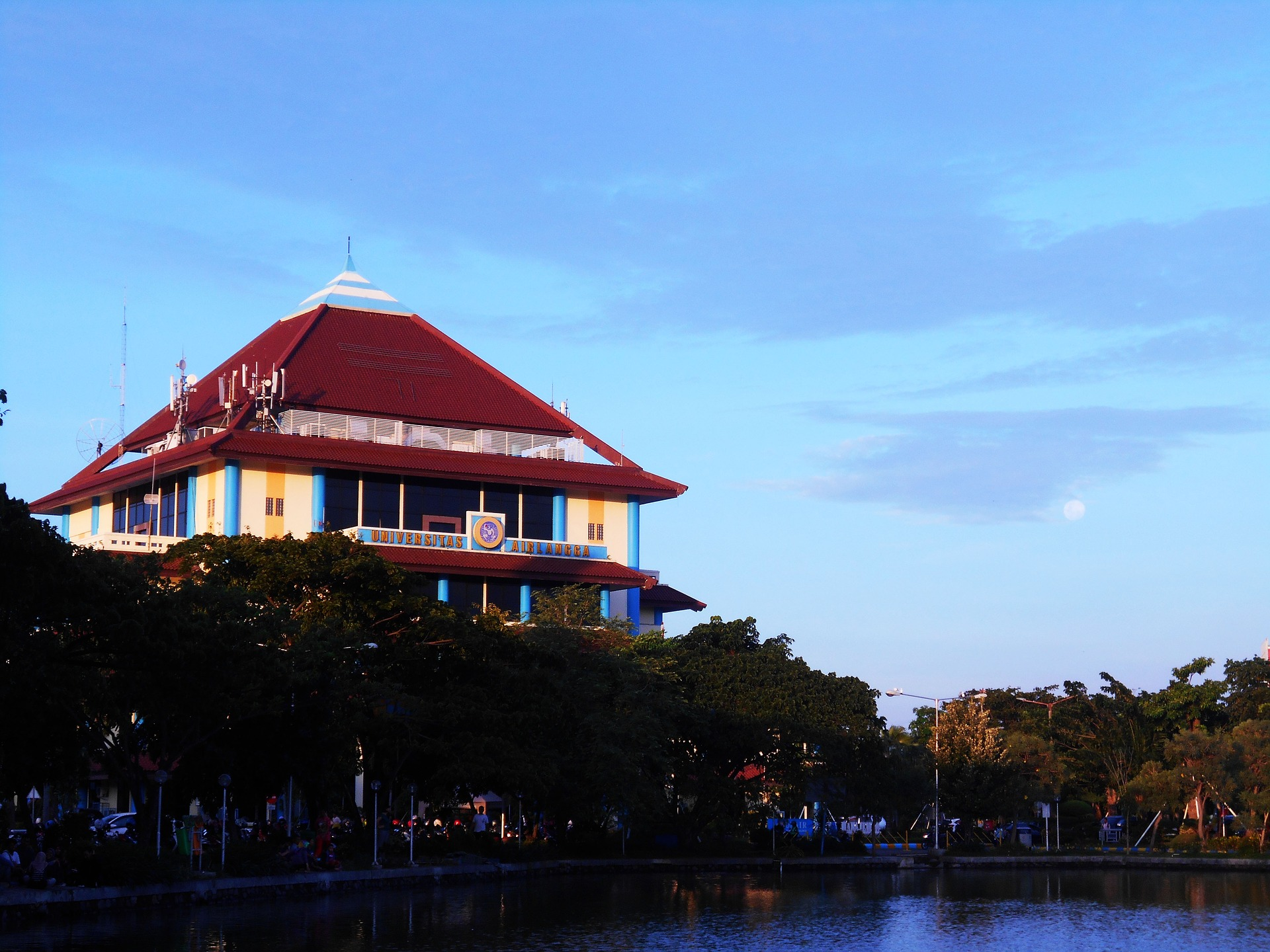
Airlangga University, Surabaya

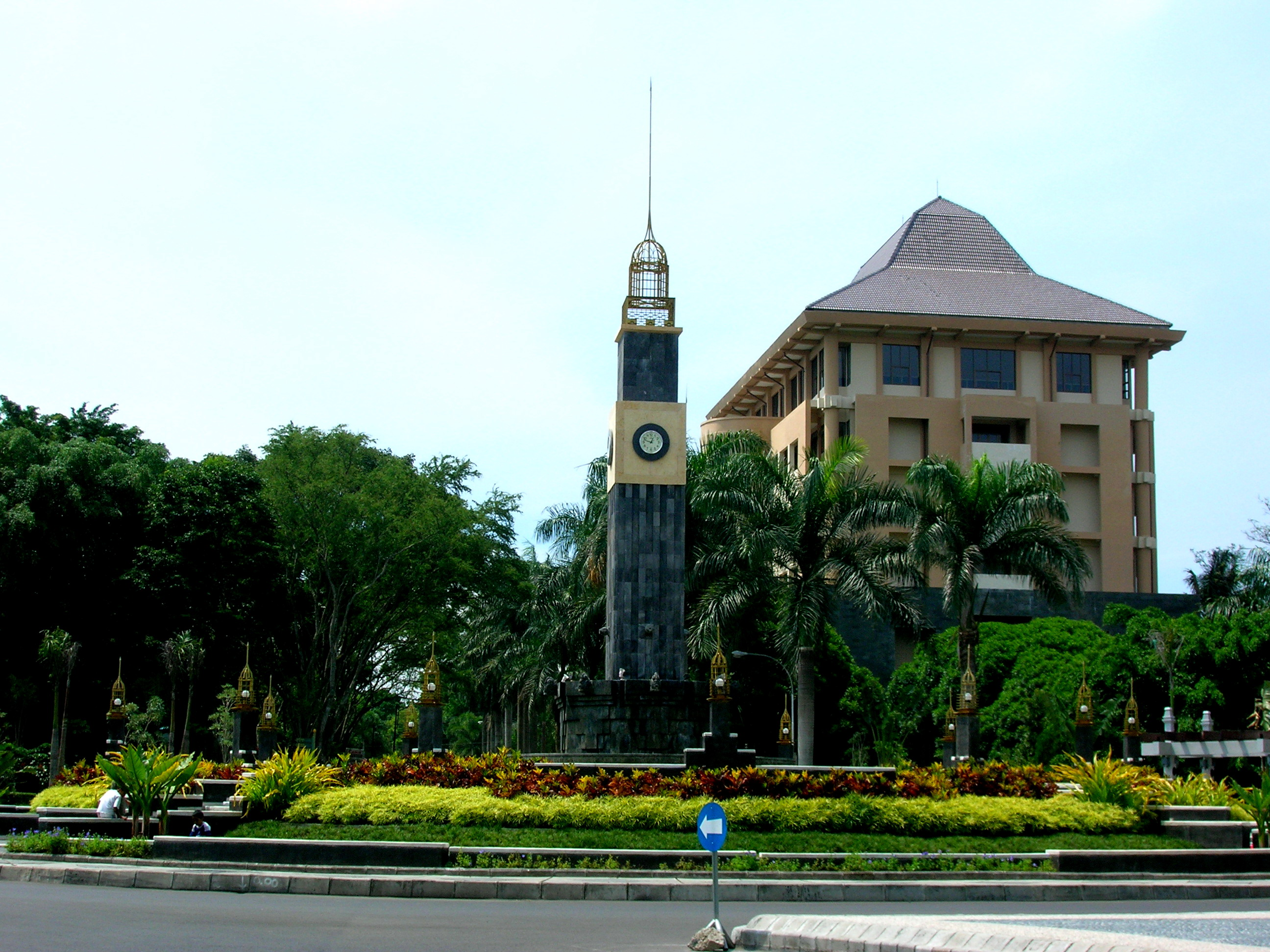
University of Brawijaya, Malang

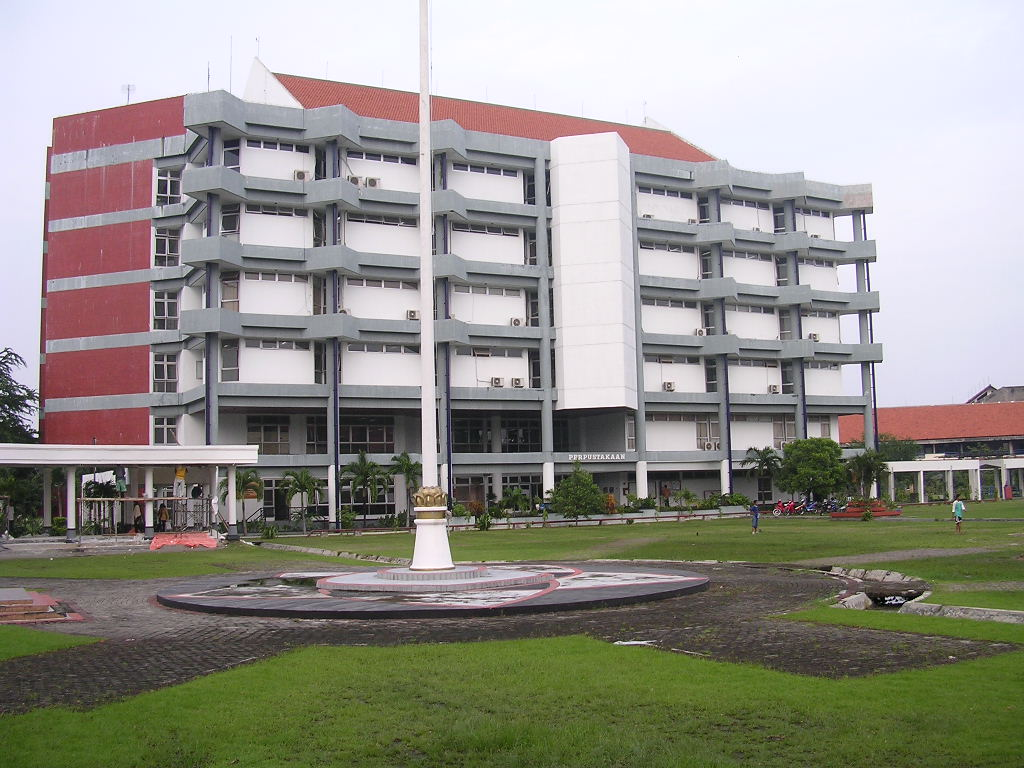
Sepuluh Nopember Institute of Technology, Surabaya

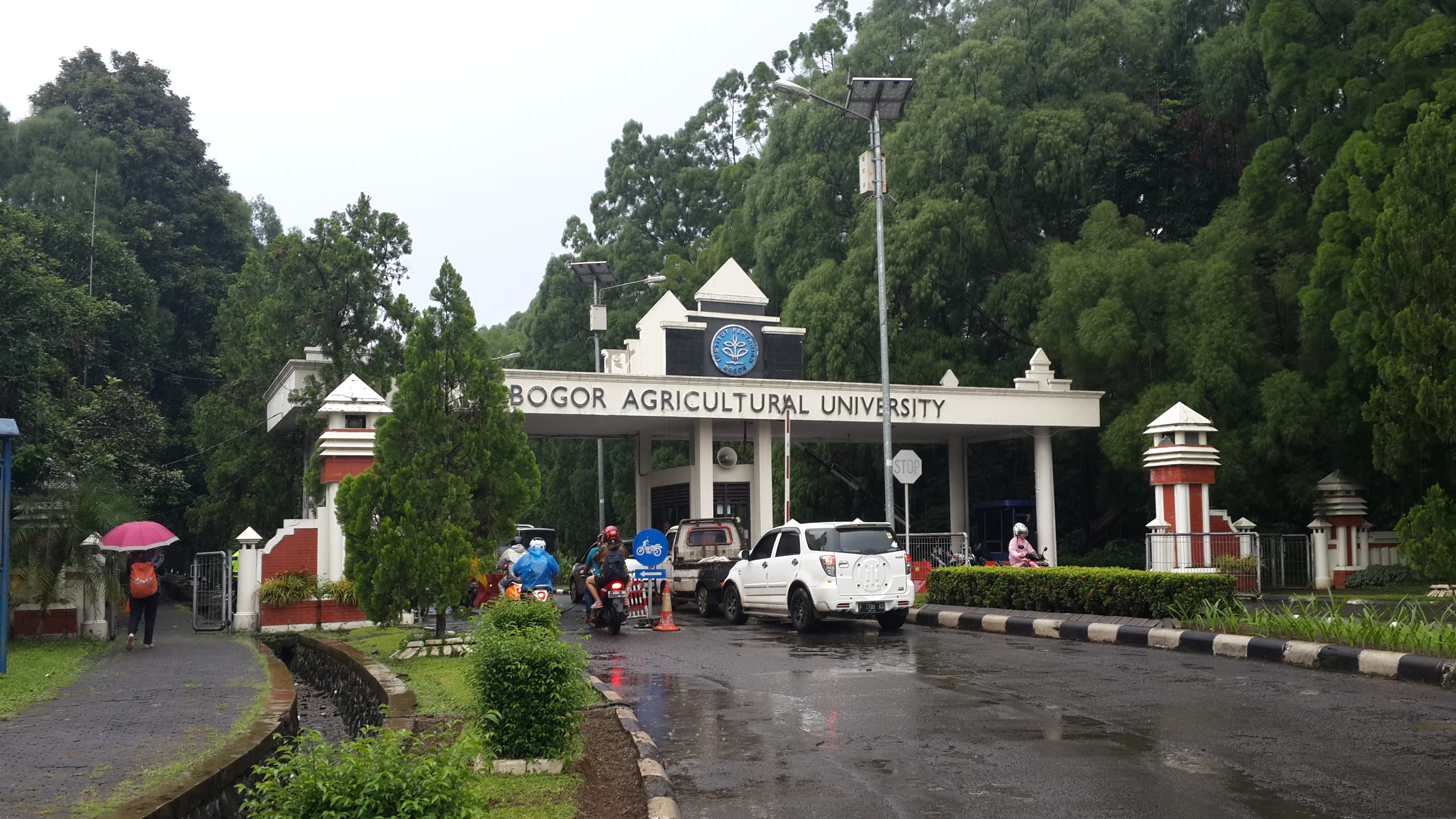
Bogor Agricultural Institute, Bogor

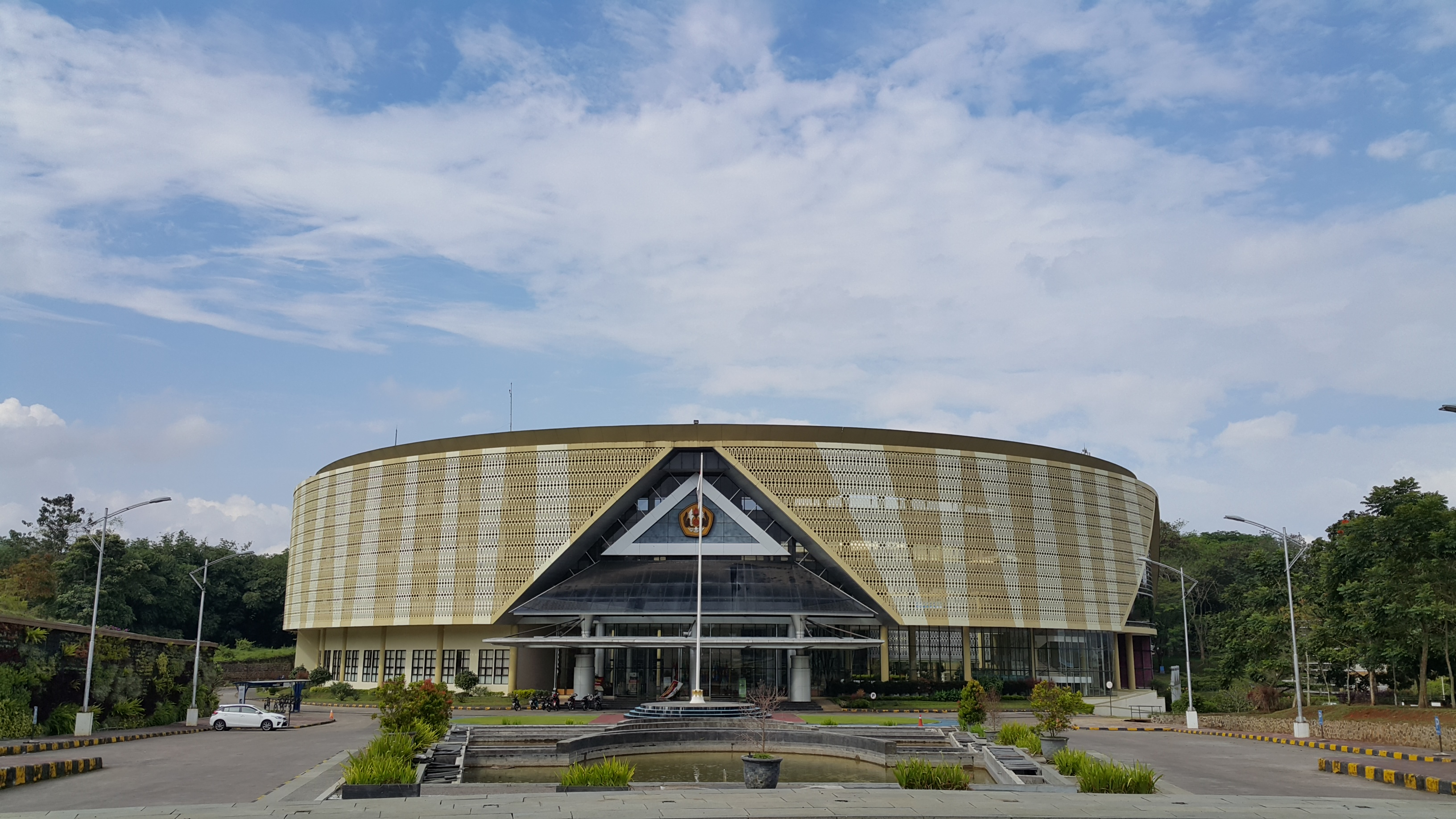
Padjadjaran University, Bandung

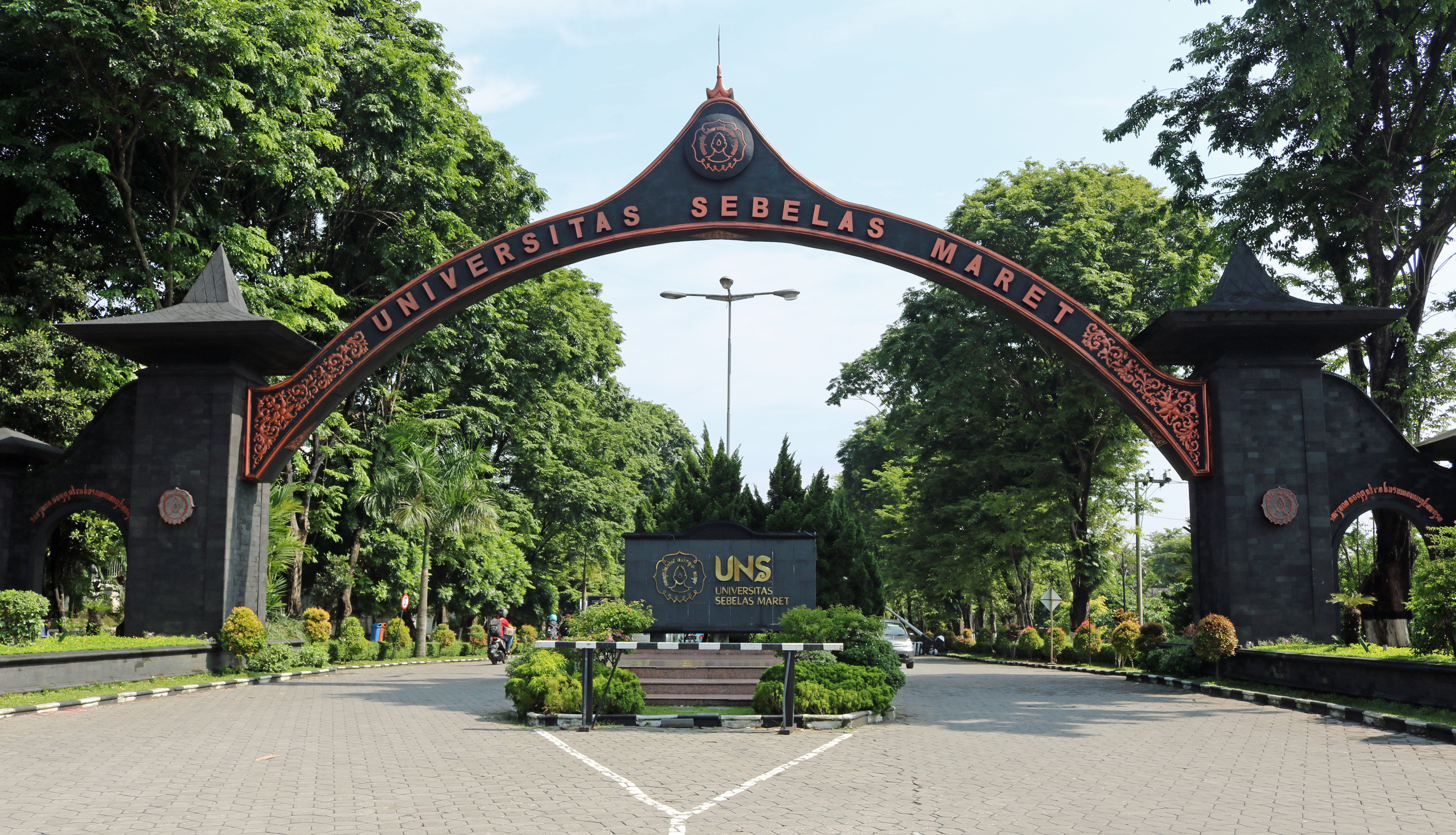
Sebelas Maret University, Surakarta

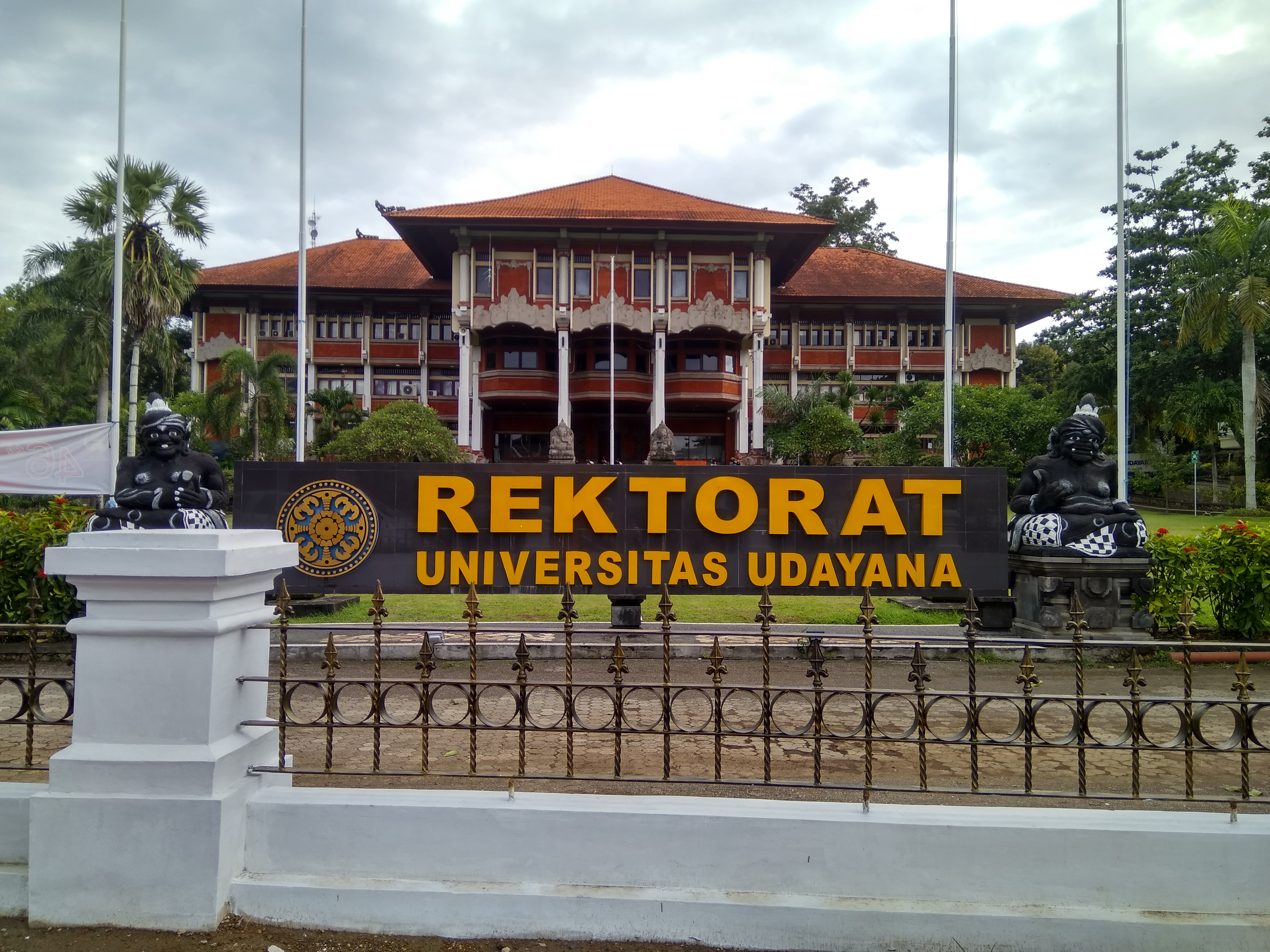
Udayana University, Bali

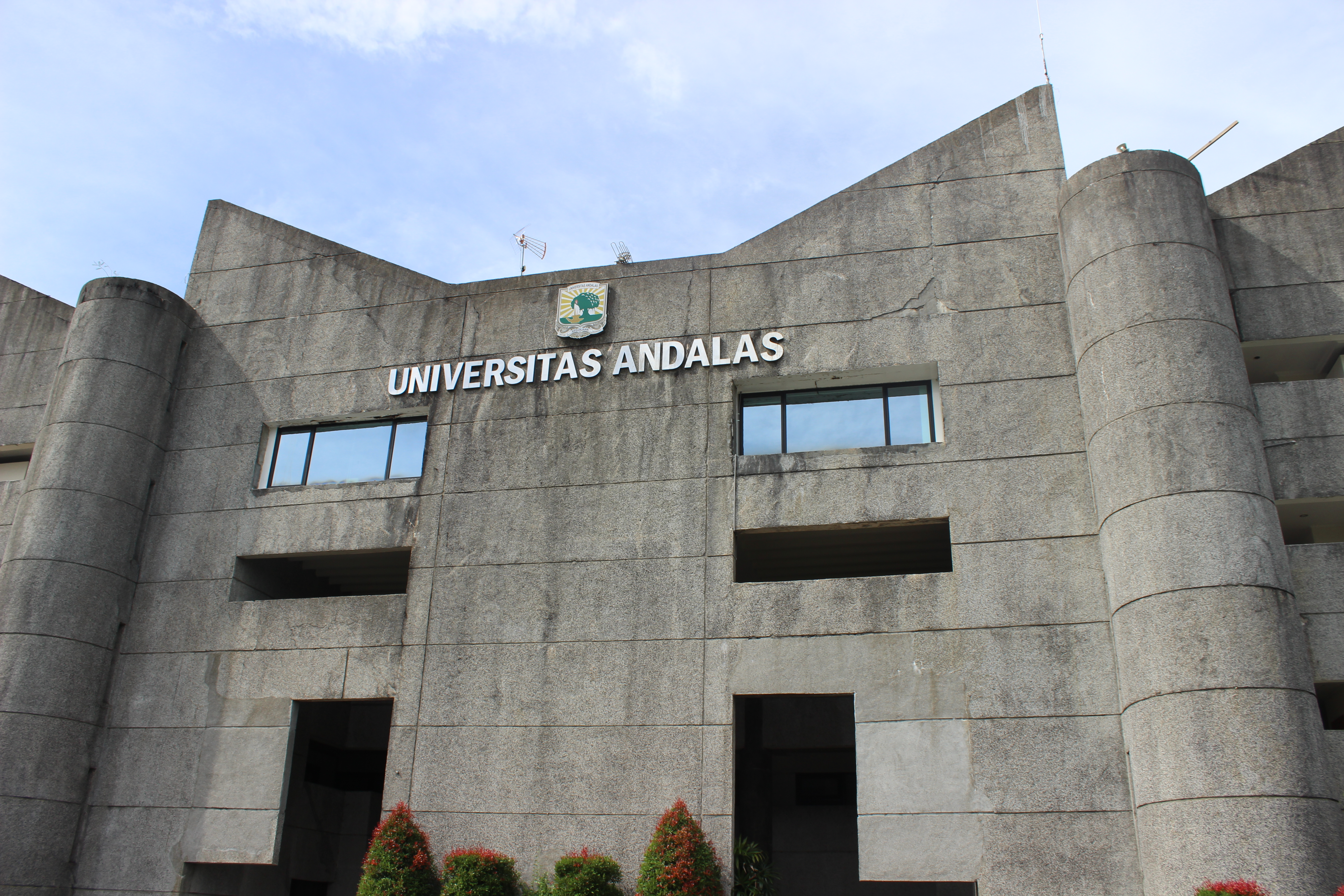
Andalas University, Padang

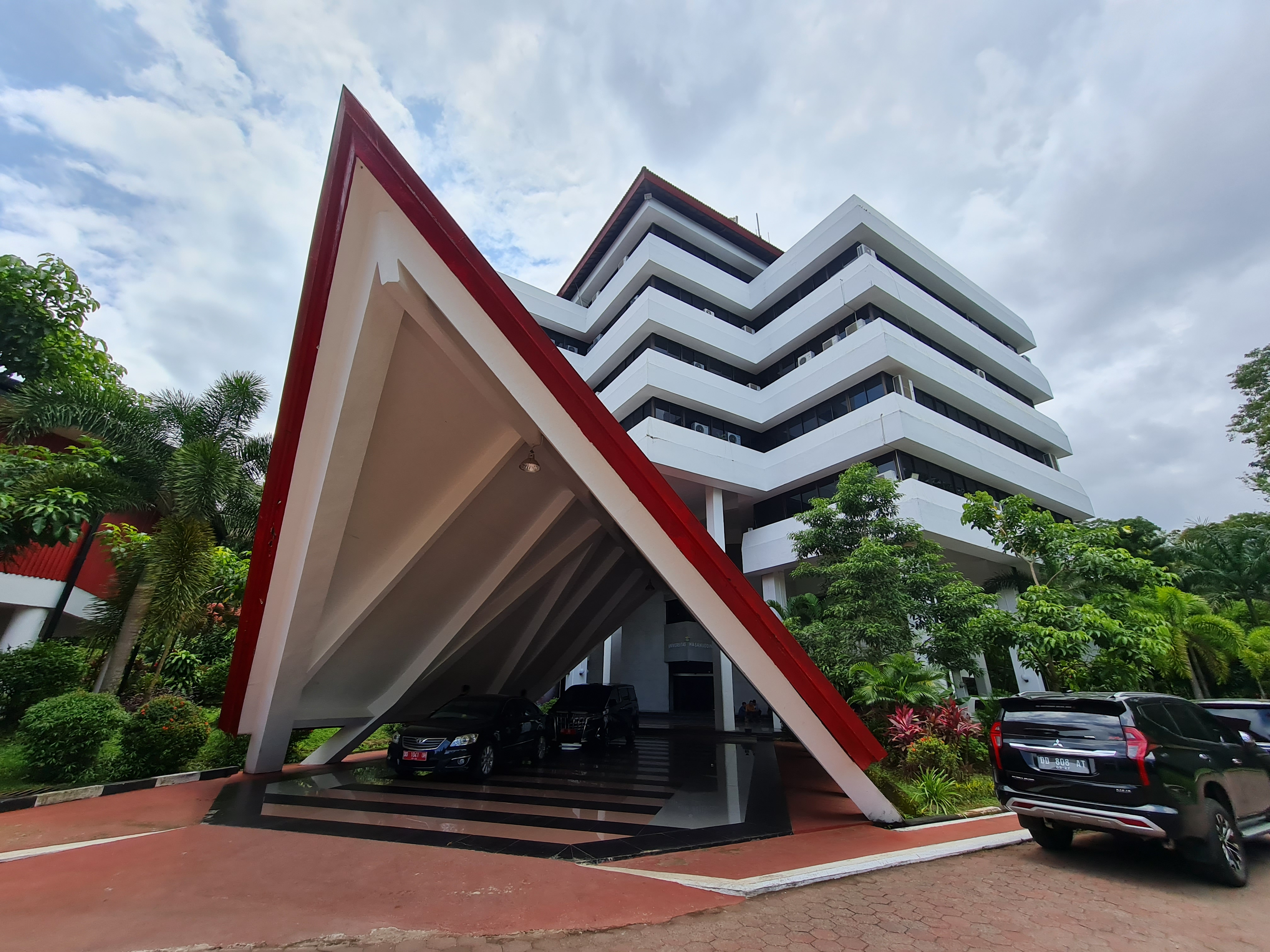
Hasanuddin University, Makassar

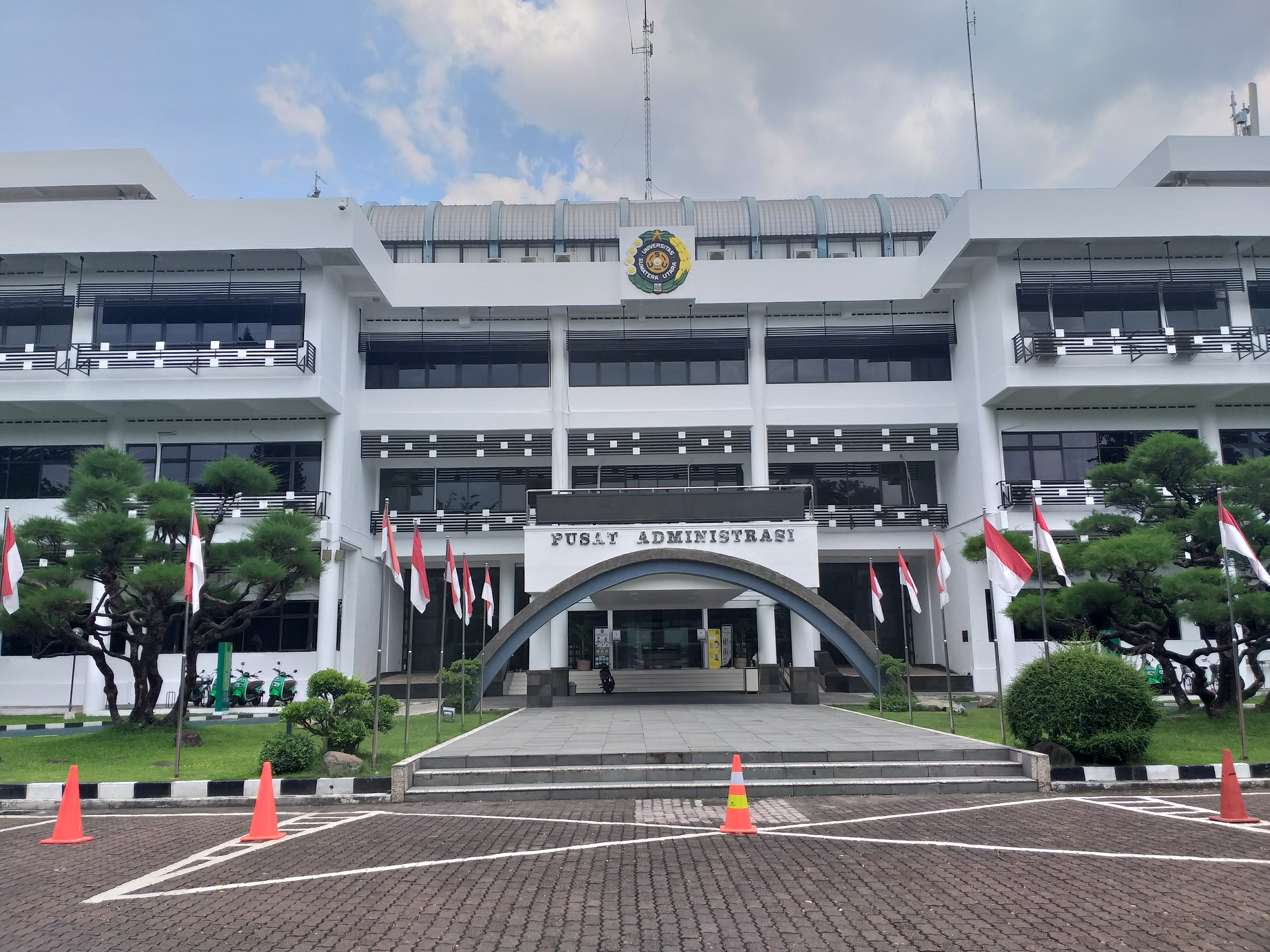
University of North Sumatra, Medan

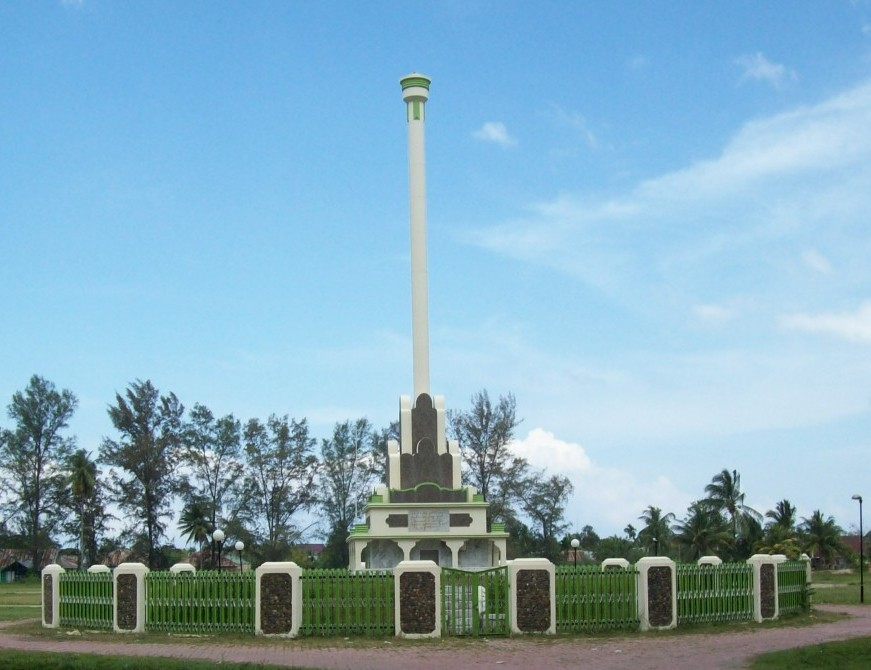
Syiah Kuala University, Banda Aceh

== See also ==
- Rankings of universities in Indonesia
- Education in Indonesia
- Test-Based National Selection (SNBT)
- List of Indonesian agricultural universities and colleges
- Union of Catholic University Students of the Republic of Indonesia (PMKRI)
