= West Sulawesi University =

Coordinates: 3.5375406°S 118.9884589°E

West Sulawesi University (Indonesian: Universitas Sulawesi Barat, abbreviated as UNSULBAR) is a public university based in Majene, West Sulawesi, Indonesia.

== History ==
UNSULBAR was one of the first universities created after the West Sulawesi province was created in 2004, though the university itself was founded in 2007. UNSULBAR was originally a private university, though by 2013 it became a public university.

== Academics ==
=== Faculties ===
UNSULBAR has six faculties, and 18 study programs, as described in the following:

==== Faculty of Agriculture and Forestry ====
Agribusiness

Forestry

Faculty of Health Science

Nursing

==== Faculty of Economics ====
Accounting

Management

==== Faculty of Engineering ====
Civil Engineering

Informatics Engineering

==== Faculty of Mathematics and Natural Sciences ====
Mathematical Science

Faculty of Social Sciences and Politics

Law

International Relations

==== Faculty of Animal Husbandry and Fisheries ====
Animal Husbandry

Aquaculture

==== Faculty of Teaching and Education Science ====
Mathematics Education

Biology Education

English Education

Physics Education.

== Ranking ==
UNSULBAR is ranked 130th amongst all Indonesian universities according to Webometrics’ 2021 Report.
