= Serang Raya University =

Private university in Serang, Indonesia

University of Serang Raya
- Universitas Serang Raya
- Motto: Future Gate with intellect
- Type: Private University
- Established: September 2001 After joining STMIK and STIE Serang became the University of Serang Raya
- Rector: Dr. Hamdan. M.M
- Academic staff: 376 (2013)
- Students: 5190 (2013)
- Location: Serang, Indonesia
- Campus: Area Urban Which is in two Regions in the province
- Colors: yellow
- Website: www.unsera.ac.id

University Of Serang Raya, abbreviated UNSERA, is a private university in the Banten province area of Indonesia resulting from the merger of two colleges – STMIK Serang and STIE Serang. The main campus is located in the western city of Serang.

== Campus building ==
The campus buildings are located at the toll booth Attack West, located in front of Park Banten Special Forces. The campus’s location in the heart of Serang city ensures easy accessibility from various parts of Banten.

=== A campus ===
The STMIK isin the University of Serang Raya oldest campus buildings. The campus halls of the University of Serang Raya Central Library Building and Rector University of Serang Raya, which house the College of Engineering have also become a place of initial formation of the university.

=== B campus ===
The campus is opposite the Headquarters and also adjacent to the Technology. Three faculties occupy the campus, namely Economics, Social and Political Sciences, and Science Communication. There are football and a basketball courts in this area of the campus.

== Faculties ==
- Information Management School
  - Information Engineering
  - Information Systems
  - Computer Systems
- College of Engineering
  - Civil Engineering
  - Industrial Engineering
  - Chemical Engineering
- Economics
  - Accounting
  - Management
- Social and Political Sciences
  - Communication Studies
  - State Administration
