= Sriwijaya State Polytechnic =

State Polytechnic of Sriwijaya
- Politeknik Negeri Sriwijaya
- Motto: Tepat Waktu; Tepat Ukuran; Tepat Aturan
- Motto in English: Right Time; Right Size; Right Rules
- Type: Public polytechnic
- Established: September 20, 1982
- Director: Dr. Ing. Ahmad Taqwa, MT.
- Location: Jl Srijaya Negara Bukit Besar Palembang 30139, Palembang, South Sumatra, Indonesia; 2.983128°S 104.732983°E
- Campus: Bukit Besar Main Campus, Palembang Banyuasin Campus, Banyuasin
- Colors: Light blue
- Nickname: Polsri
- Website: www.polsi.ac.id
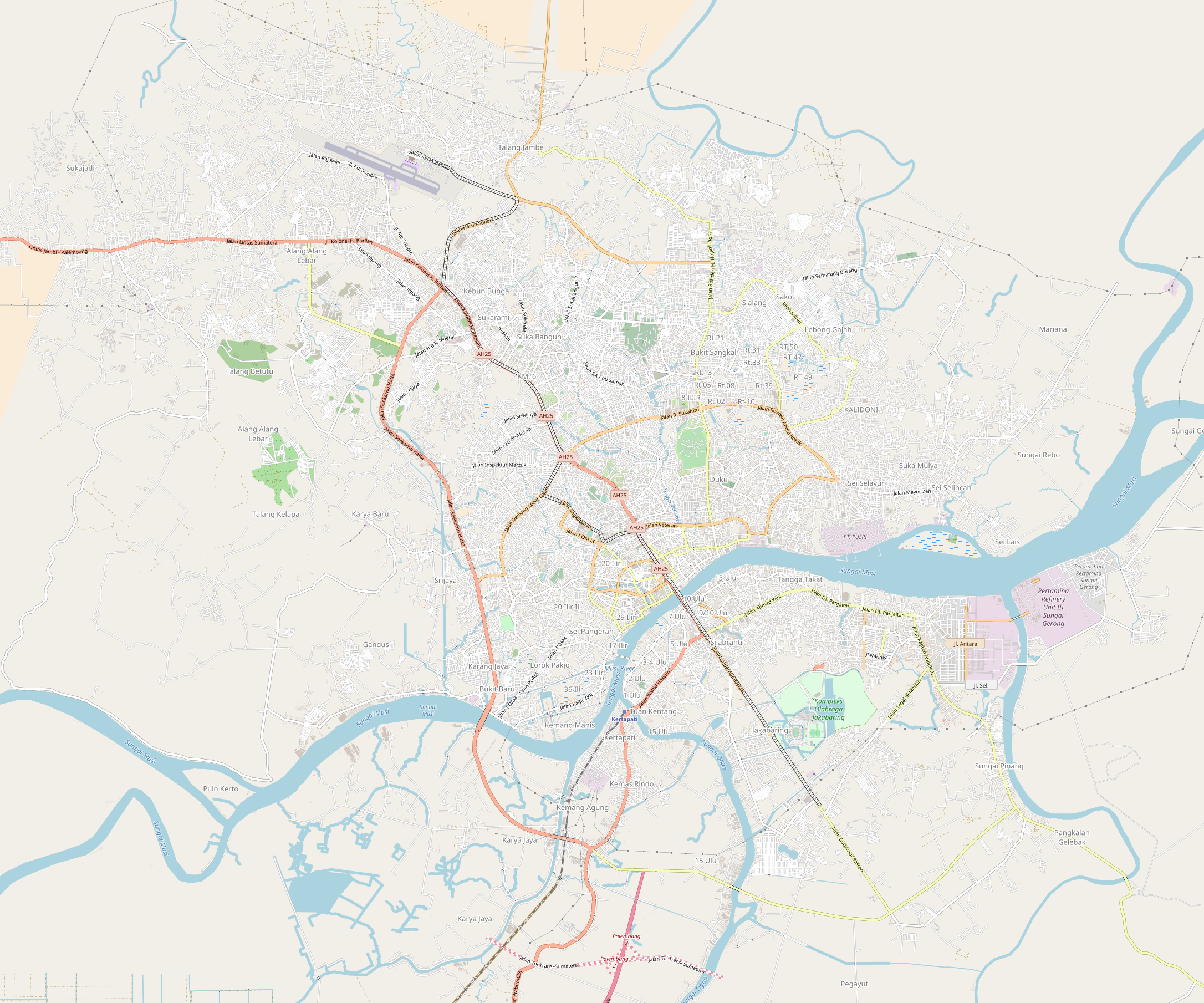
- Location in Palembang

Sriwijaya State Polytechnic (in Indonesian: Politeknik Negeri Sriwijaya), abbreviated as Polsri is a public polytechnic located in Palembang and Banyuasin, which is the provincial capital and regency of South Sumatra, Indonesia. It was established on September 20, 1982.

== History ==
As the Pilot Plant of the Polytechnic, Swiss Mechanic Polytechnic – ITB was born in 1976. The products of this Polytechnic are very encouraging because the alumni are used in industries. For this success, it is then proposed to plan the procurement of Polytechnic education in various regions in Indonesia.

Sriwijaya State Polytechnic, formerly called the Sriwijaya University Polytechnic, was officially opened on September 20, 1982. In the first phase, the Polytechnic only had 2 (two) Departments, namely the Department of Civil Engineering and the Department of Mechanical Engineering with a maximum capacity of 576 students and with educational facilities, staff teachers and curricula assembled nationally and centralized at the Bandung Polytechnic Education Development Center (PEDC).

In the second phase in 1987 the Polytechnic expanded the field of engineering and gave birth to the field of Commerce. The engineering fields developed were the Departments of Electrical Engineering, Electronics Engineering, Telecommunication Engineering and Industrial Chemical Engineering, while the field of Commerce consisted of the Department/Study Program for Secretarial Accounting which began in the 1986 academic year. Then in 1992 the Department of Commerce developed into two majors, namely the Department of Accounting and Commerce Administration. The experts participating in developing the engineering field are from Swiss Contact while Tata Commerce is from Australia.

In 2002/2003 two new departments were developed, namely Computer Engineering and Informatics Management, whose establishment was stipulated through a letter from the Director General of Higher Education (Dirjen Dikti) number 2800/D/T/2001. In the 2004/2005 academic year, Sriwijaya State Polytechnic again developed a new department, namely the English Department of Tourism and Hospitality Business English Study Program based on permission from the Director General of Higher Education number 3818/D/T/2003.

== Academics ==
Sriwijaya State Polytechnic has 9 departments and 25 study programs as follows:

=== Diploma I (Study Program Outside Domicile/PDD) (Closed) ===
- Informatics Management Informatics Management Study Program (Pagaalam City)

=== Diploma II (Study Program Outside Domicile/PDD) (Closed) ===
- Accounting Study Program in Accounting (Prabumulih City)
- Business Administration Business Administration Study Program (Prabumulih City)
- Computer Engineering Computer Engineering Study Program (Prabumulih City)
- Informatics Management Informatics Management Study Program (Pangkalpinang City)

=== Diploma III ===
- Civil Engineering
- Mechanical Engineering
- Electrical Engineering
- Electronic engineering
- Telecommunications engineering
- Chemical Engineering (Palembang Campus and PSDKU SIAK RIAU)
- Accountancy
- Business Administration (Palembang Campus and PSDKU OKU)
- Computer Engineering
- Informatics Management
- English
- Food Technology (Banyuasin Campus)

=== Diploma IV/Applied Bachelor ===
- Road and Bridge Design (Palembang Campus and PSDKU OKU)
- Production and Maintenance Mechanical Engineering (Palembang Campus and PSDKU SIAK RIAU)
- Energy Engineering
- Industrial Chemical Technology
- Public Sector Accounting (Palembang Campus, PSDKU OKU and PSDKU Siak RIAU)
- Electrical Engineering (Mechatronics Concentration)
- Telecommunications engineering
- Travel agent
- Business management
- Digital Multimedia Informatics Technology
- Informatics Management
- Informatics Management (Banyuasin Campus)
- Plantation Plant Production Technology (Banyuasin Campus)

=== Applied Masters ===
- Renewable Energy Engineering
- Marketing, Innovation and Technology
