= Astra Manufacturing Polytechnic =

Politeknik Astra
- Former names: Akademi Teknik Federal; Politeknik Manufaktur Astra
- Type: Private vocational higher education institution
- Established: 1995
- Parent institution: Astra Bina Ilmu Foundation (Yayasan Astra Bina Ilmu; YABI)
- Students: 2,173 (2026)
- Location: Cikarang, West Java, Indonesia; 6.3487289°S 107.1489604°E
- Campus: Cikarang and Sunter
- Website: www.polytechnic.astra.ac.id

Politeknik Astra (also known by its brand name ASTRAtech) is a private vocational higher education institution in Indonesia offering Diploma III (D3) and Applied Bachelor's (D4) programmes. The institution is managed by the Astra Bina Ilmu Foundation (Yayasan Astra Bina Ilmu; YABI), one of the foundations within the Astra International Group.

As of 2026, Politeknik Astra has nine study programmes and 2,173 active students. Its academic programmes cover manufacturing, automotive engineering, mechatronics, construction, logistics, and information technology.

The institution's main academic campus is located in the Delta Silicon II industrial area in Cikarang, Bekasi Regency, West Java. It also maintains a location in Sunter, North Jakarta.

== History ==
=== Founding and early development (1995–2007) ===
Politeknik Astra was established in Jakarta in 1995 by PT Federal Motor, now known as PT Astra Honda Motor, through the Federal Bina Ilmu Foundation (Yayasan Federal Bina Ilmu). It was initially established under the name Akademi Teknik Federal (Federal Technical Academy).

In the same year, the institution introduced its Production Tool Making programme (Pembuatan Peralatan dan Perkakas Produksi; P4). The Production and Manufacturing Process programme (Teknik Produksi dan Proses Manufaktur; TPM) was introduced in 1996, followed by Information Management (Manajemen Informatika; MI) in 1999.

In 2001, Akademi Teknik Federal was renamed Politeknik Manufaktur Astra, commonly known as Polman Astra. In 2003, the institution introduced the Automotive Maintenance programme (Mesin Otomotif; MO).

=== Development of the education system (2008–2020) ===
In 2008, Polman Astra began developing a dual-system approach to vocational education, integrating academic instruction with practical learning in industrial settings. The system is now known as the ASTRAtech Dual System (ADS).

During 2015–2016, Polman Astra developed a Diploma III Berufsbildung programme in Automotive Maintenance, incorporating elements of the German dual vocational education system.

In 2018, the institution introduced Mechatronics (Mekatronika; MK) and Building Construction Technology (Teknologi Konstruksi Bangunan Gedung; TKBG) as additional fields of study.

On 10 May 2019, construction of a new Polman Astra campus in the Delta Silicon II industrial area in Cikarang began with a groundbreaking ceremony.

=== Renaming and institutional development (2021–present) ===
On 21 April 2021, Politeknik Manufaktur Astra was officially renamed Politeknik Astra and adopted ASTRAtech as its brand identity.

On 22 May 2023, the institution inaugurated its new campus in the Delta Silicon II area of Cikarang, Bekasi Regency, West Java. The campus was built on a site covering approximately five hectares.

== Campuses ==
Politeknik Astra has two locations: its main academic campus in Cikarang, Bekasi Regency, West Java, and another institutional location in Sunter, North Jakarta.

=== Cikarang campus ===
Politeknik Astra's campus in Cikarang

The Cikarang campus is located in the Delta Silicon II industrial area, Cibatu, South Cikarang, Bekasi Regency, West Java. It serves as the institution's main location for academic activities.

Construction began in May 2019, and the campus was officially inaugurated on 22 May 2023. The campus occupies approximately five hectares of land and includes facilities for classroom instruction and practical learning.

=== Sunter location ===
Politeknik Astra's building in Sunter, North Jakarta

The Sunter location is situated within the Astra International complex, Building B, Jalan Gaya Motor Raya No. 8, Sunter II, North Jakarta. It was previously the institution's location for academic activities before teaching and learning activities were relocated to Cikarang.

The institution continues to list the Sunter address in its official institutional information.

== Educational system ==
Politeknik Astra applies the ASTRAtech Dual System (ADS), a vocational education model that integrates academic learning with practical activities in industrial settings. The dual-system approach began to be developed in 2008, when the institution was still known as Politeknik Manufaktur Astra.

=== Industry-integrated learning ===
Under the ASTRAtech Dual System, industrial partners are involved in several stages of education, including curriculum development, teaching by industry practitioners, the provision of practical learning facilities, and student internships. Industrial requirements also serve as a reference for the development of learning materials and study programmes.

Industry involvement also extends to applied research and technology development. Lecturers and students may participate in projects involving production problem-solving, design, fabrication, testing, and the application of technology in industrial settings.

In September 2025, Politeknik Astra and PT DENSO Indonesia established a collaboration through the IA Creation Lab at DENSO's Fajar Plant in Bekasi. The initiative involved lecturers and students in research and technology development activities addressing industrial challenges.

=== Education and industry partnerships ===
The ASTRAtech Dual System framework involves cooperation among four stakeholder groups: industry, government, associations, and educational institutions. Forms of cooperation include curriculum development, joint learning activities, competency certification, internships, student and lecturer exchanges, and applied research.

The institution's activities related to the dual-system model also include production, training, and consulting services associated with industrial applications.

== Academic programmes ==
Politeknik Astra offers nine study programmes, consisting of six Diploma III (D3) programmes and three Applied Bachelor's (D4) programmes.

In November 2026, the institution introduced new branding names for its nine study programmes for the 2027–2028 academic year. The new names are used alongside the programmes' official Indonesian names.

=== Diploma III (D3) programmes ===
The institution offers six programmes at the Diploma III level:

- Mechanical Design & Manufacturing – Pembuatan Peralatan dan Perkakas Produksi (P4)
- Industrial & Process Engineering – Teknik Produksi dan Proses Manufaktur (TPM)
- Automotive Engineering – Mesin Otomotif (MO)
- Digital Technology for Business – Manajemen Informatika (MI)
- Mechatronics & Robotics – Mekatronika (MK)
- Digital Civil Engineering – Teknologi Konstruksi Bangunan Gedung (TKBG)

=== Applied Bachelor's (D4) programmes ===
The institution offers three programmes at the Applied Bachelor's level:

- Heavy Equipment Engineering – Teknologi Rekayasa Pemeliharaan Alat Berat (TRPAB)
- Logistics Engineering – Teknologi Rekayasa Logistik (TRL)
- AI & Software Engineering – Teknologi Rekayasa Perangkat Lunak (TRPL)
