= University of Palembang =

Private university in Indonesia

- Universitas Palembang
- Type: Private
- Established: 21 February 1981; 45 years ago (as Yayasan Perguruan Tinggi Sriwijaya); 8 August 1981; 45 years ago (as Yayasan Perguruan Tinggi Palembang); 1982; 44 years ago (as Universitas Palembang)
- Rector: Dr. Ali Dahwir, S.H., M.H.
- Location: Jl. Dharmapala No.1A, Palembang, South Sumatra; 02°59′32″S 104°43′32″E
- Campus: Urban
- Colors: Light Yellow
- Website: unpal.ac.id
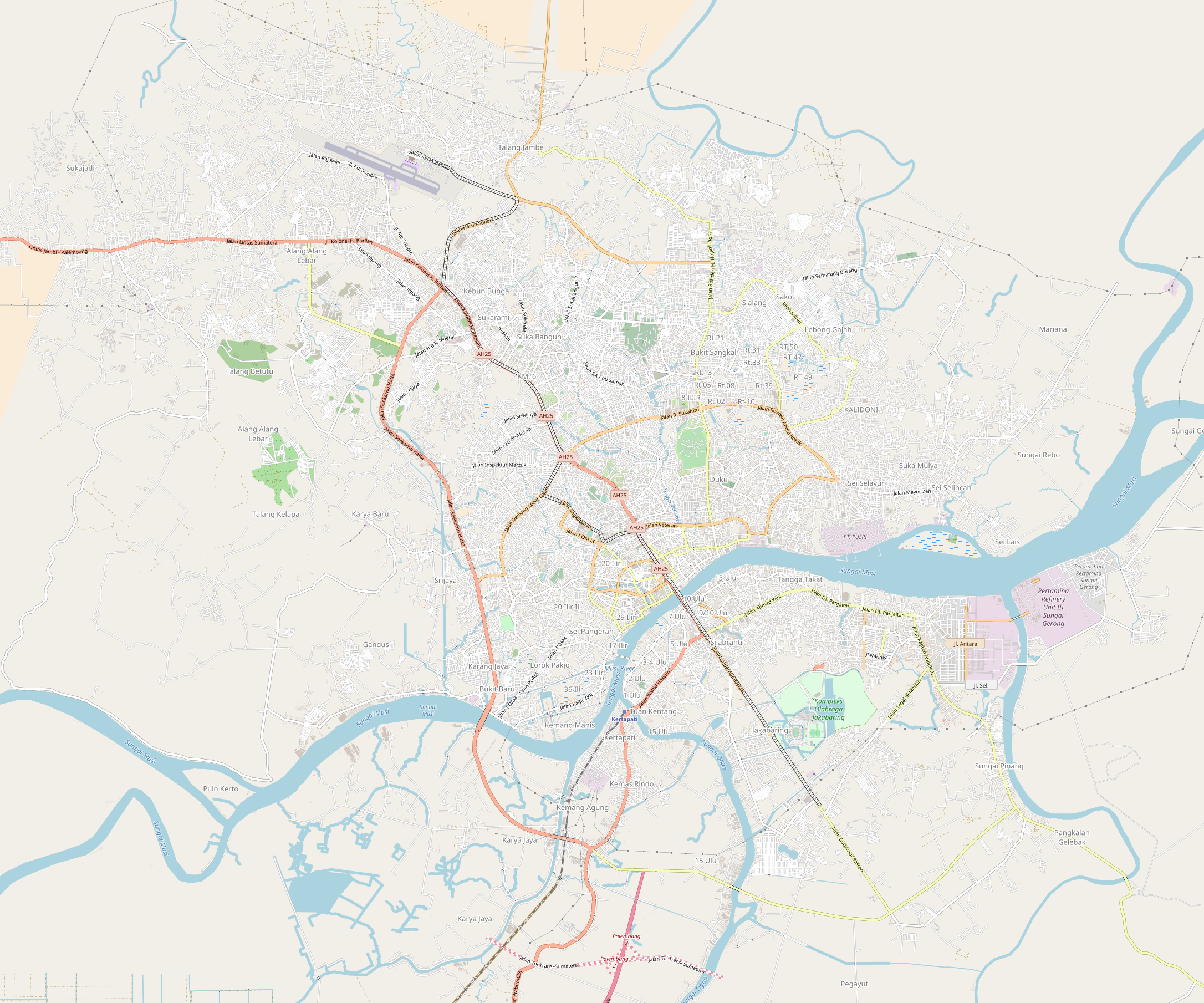
- Location in Palembang

University of Palembang (Indonesian: Universitas Palembang; abbreviated as UNPAL) is a private university in Palembang, South Sumatra, Indonesia. It was founded on 21 February 1981 as the Sriwijaya Higher Education Foundation (Indonesian: Yayasan Perguruan Tinggi Sriwijaya) before finally changing its name to what it is now the following year. Its current rector is Dr. Ali Dahwir, S.H., M.H. (2023–2027) who were elected on 22 July 2023.

== History ==
In the beginning, this university was not straightforward as big as now, but stood from nothing by starting from a strong passion and responsibility to serve the nation and the State of the Republic of Indonesia. On the basis of and encouraged by several prominent educational figures in Palembang, established a Sriwijaya Higher Education Foundation (Indonesian: Yayasan Perguruan Tinggi Sriwijaya) which was poured through Deed of Notary Henny Jeanne Pattinama, SH Number 16 dated 21 February 1981.

On 16 July 1981, the Foundation received a recommendation from the Governor South Sumatra with Number: 241-4/003640/X. Then on 8 August 1981 the name of the Foundation changed to the Higher Education Foundation Palembang (Indonesian: Yayasan Perguruan Tinggi Palembang atau YPTP) through the same Notary as Number 11 onwards registered at the Palembang District Court Number: 20/1981 dated 11 August 1981. At first the Palembang Higher Education foundation founded the School College of Economics (STIE), then in February 1982 was established College of Law (STIH), College of Agricultural Sciences (STIP), and College of Engineering (STIT). Then the four Science Colleges merged into the University of Palembang (Indonesian: Universitas Palembang), which consists of four faculties, namely: Faculty of Economics, Faculty of Law, Faculty of Agriculture, Faculty of Engineering.

After running for three years, the University of Palembang changed its status to Registered based on the Decree of the Minister of Education and Culture number: 0611/O/1985 dated 2 December 1985. In 1992, the status of the University of Palembang increased to Recognized based on the Decree of the Director General of Higher Education Number: 139/DIKTI/Kep/1992 dated 28 April 1992 for the Undergraduate Program (S1) of the Faculty Economics Department of Management, Faculty of Law Department of Law, Faculty Agriculture, Department of Agricultural Cultivation, and Faculty of Engineering, Department of Civil Engineering.

== Faculties ==
University of Palembang has 4 faculties, namely:

- Faculty of Economics
  - Management
  - English Education
- Faculty of Engineering
  - Electrical Engineering
  - Civil Engineering)
- Faculty of Law
  - Legal Science
- Faculty of Agriculture
  - Agrotechnology
