= University of Singaperbangsa Karawang =

University in Karawang, Indonesia

- Universitas Singaperbangsa Karawang
- Type: Public University
- Established: 2 February 1982
- Rector: Prof. Dr. Ade Maman Suherman, SH, M.Sc. (2023-2027)
- Location: Karawang, Jawa Barat, Indonesia; 6°19′23″S 107°18′23″E
- Colors: Maroon
- Nickname: UNSIKA
- Website: www.unsika.ac.id

University of Singaperbangsa Karawang (Indonesian: Universitas Singaperbangsa Karawang) is the first university to be established in Karawang. It was established on 2 February 1982. The university is named Raden Adipati Singaperbangsa, founder of Karawang under Sultan Agung of Mataram. On October 6, 2014 UNSIKA became a public university.

== Faculties ==
- Faculty of Law
- Faculty of Economics and Business
- Faculty of Teacher Training and Education
- Faculty of Agriculture
- Faculty of Islamic Studie
- Faculty of Engineering
- Faculty of Computer Science
- Faculty of Social Science and Political Science
- Faculty of Health Science
