= Rankings of universities in ASEAN =

Rankings of universities in Southeast Asia have been published by QS World University Rankings, Times Higher Education, SCImago Journal Rank and others.

QS World Best Student Cities in Southeast Asia location map

== QS Rankings ==
=== QS World Best Student Cities ===
| Top 10 | City | Country | 2018 | 2019 | 2022 | 2023 | 2024 | 2025 | 2026 | 2027 |
|---|---|---|---|---|---|---|---|---|---|---|
| 1 | Singapore | Singapore | 15 | 20 | 17 | 13 | 15 | 15 | 11 | 11 |
| 2 | Kuala Lumpur | Malaysia | 37 | 29 | 31 | 28 | 24 | 23 | 12 | 15 |
| 3 | Bangkok | Thailand | 54 | 59 | 74 | 57 | 71 | 59 | 55 | 52 |
| 4 | Metro Manila | Philippines | 95 | 85 | 113 | 111 | 115 | 103 | 88 | 102 |
| 5 | Jakarta | Indonesia | - | 109 | - | 124 | 122 | 120 | 116 | 117 |
| 6 | Yogyakarta | Indonesia | - | - | - | - | 126 | 117 | 121 | 118 |
| 7 | Bandung | Indonesia | - | - | - | 120 | 133 | 132 | 123 | 128 |
| 8 | Surabaya | Indonesia | - | - | - | 126 | 145 | 142 | 143 | 140 |

=== QS World University Rankings : Overall ===
| Top 500 world | University | Country | Size | 2018 | 2019 | 2020 | 2021 | 2022 | 2023 | 2024 | 2025 | 2026 | 2027 |
|---|---|---|---|---|---|---|---|---|---|---|---|---|---|
| 1 | National University of Singapore | Singapore | XL | 15 | 11 | 11 | 11 | 11 | 11 | 8 | 8 | 8 | 10 |
| 2 | (Singapore) Nanyang Technological University | Singapore | L | 11 | 12 | 11 | 13 | 12 | 19 | 26 | 15 | 12 | 12 |
| 3 | (Malaysia) Universiti Malaya | Malaysia | L | 114 | 87 | 70 | 59 | 65 | 70 | 65 | 60 | 58 | 56 |
| 4 | Universiti Sains Malaysia | Malaysia | L | 264 | 207 | 165 | 142 | 147 | 143 | 137 | 146 | 134 | 128 |
| 5 | Universiti Kebangsaan Malaysia | Malaysia | L | 230 | 184 | 160 | 141 | 144 | 129 | 159 | 138 | 126 | 130 |
| 6 | Universiti Putra Malaysia | Malaysia | L | 229 | 202 | 159 | 132 | 143 | 123 | 158 | 148 | 134 | 138 |
| 7 | Universiti Teknologi Malaysia | Malaysia | L | 253 | 228 | 217 | 187 | 191 | 203 | 188 | 181 | 153 | 158 |
| 8 | Universitas Indonesia | Indonesia | XL | 277 | 292 | 296 | 305 | 290 | 248 | 237 | 206 | 189 | 191 |
| 9 | (Indonesia) Gadjah Mada University | Indonesia | XL | 401-410 | 391 | 320 | 254 | 254 | 231 | 263 | 239 | 224 | 206 |
| 10 | (Thailand) Chulalongkorn University | Thailand | XL | 245 | 271 | 247 | 208 | 215 | 224 | 211 | 229 | 221 | 212 |
| 11 | (Malaysia) Universiti Teknologi PETRONAS | Malaysia | S | 601-650 | 521-530 | 482 | 439 | 414 | 361 | 307 | 269 | 251 | 261 |
| 12 | (Singapore) SUTD | Singapore | S | N/A | N/A | N/A | N/A | N/A | N/A | 429 | 440 | 519 | 266 |
| 13 | (Malaysia) Taylor's University | Malaysia | S | N/A | 601-650 | 511-520 | 379 | 332 | 284 | 284 | 251 | 253 | 272 |
| 14 | (Indonesia) Airlangga University | Indonesia | XL | 701-750 | 751-800 | 651-700 | 521-530 | 465 | 369 | 345 | 308 | 287 | 276 |
| 15 | (Indonesia) Bandung Institute of Technology | Indonesia | L | 331 | 359 | 331 | 313 | 303 | 235 | 281 | 256 | 255 | 287 |
| 16 | (Malaysia) UCSI University | Malaysia | M | N/A | 481 | 442 | 391 | 347 | 284 | 300 | 265 | 269 | 282 |
| 17 | (Thailand) Mahidol University | Thailand | L | 334 | 380 | 314 | 252 | 255 | 256 | 382 | 368 | 358 | 345 |
| 18 | Universiti Brunei Darussalam | Brunei | S | 349 | 323 | 298 | 254 | 250 | 256 | 387 | 385 | 367 | 345 |
| 20 | University of the Philippines | Philippines | XL | 367 | 384 | 356 | 396 | 399 | 412 | 404 | 336 | 362 | 402 |
| 23 | (Indonesia) IPB University | Indonesia | XL | 751-800 | 701-750 | 601-650 | 531-540 | 511-520 | 449 | 489 | 426 | 399 | 419 |
| 24 | (Indonesia) Padjadjaran University | Indonesia | XL | - | 651-700 | 751-800 | 801-1000 | 801-1000 | 751-800 | 661-700 | 596 | 515 | 496 |
| 25 | (Indonesia) Sepuluh Nopember Institute of Technology (ITS) | Indonesia | L | 801-1000 | 801-1000 | 801-1000 | 751-800 | 751-800 | 701-750 | 621-630 | 585 | 509 | 497 |

=== QS World University Rankings : Academic ===
| Top 10 | University | Country | 2020 | 2021 | 2022 | 2023 | 2024 | 2025 | 2026 | 2027 |
|---|---|---|---|---|---|---|---|---|---|---|
| 1 | National University of Singapore | Singapore | 11 | 12 | 12 | 13 | 15 | 15 | 14 | 12 |
| 2 | (Singapore) Nanyang Technological University | Singapore | 37 | 44 | 39 | 42 | 42 | 42 | 42 | 36 |
| 3 | (Malaysia) Universiti Malaya | Malaysia | 91 | 78 | 72 | 70 | 68 | 62 | 58 | 56 |
| 4 | (Thailand) Chulalongkorn University | Thailand | 108 | 96 | 96 | 104 | 101 | 97 | 89 | 88 |
| 5 | Universiti Sains Malaysia | Malaysia | 158 | 142 | 123 | 118 | 115 | 106 | 104 | 105 |
| 6 | Universiti Kebangsaan Malaysia | Malaysia | 153 | 142 | 130 | 126 | 121 | 113 | 106 | 111 |
| 7 | Universiti Putra Malaysia | Malaysia | 177 | 155 | 143 | 132 | 129 | 118 | 108 | 117 |
| 8 | Universitas Indonesia | Indonesia | 205 | 203 | 185 | 168 | 161 | 148 | 135 | 130 |
| 9 | (Indonesia) Gadjah Mada University | Indonesia | 193 | 174 | 164 | 160 | 152 | 145 | 134 | 131 |
| 10 | Universiti Teknologi Malaysia | Malaysia | 251 | 211 | 193 | 186 | 175 | 166 | 158 | 158 |
| 11 | (Thailand) Mahidol University | Thailand | - | - | - | - | - | - | 177 | 170 |
| 12 | (Indonesia) Bandung Institute of Technology (ITB) | Indonesia | - | - | - | - | - | - | 181 | 182 |
| 13 | (Indonesia) Airlangga University | Indonesia | - | - | - | - | - | - | 213 | 207 |
| 14 | (Malaysia) Universiti Teknologi MARA | Malaysia | - | - | - | - | - | - | 267 | 253 |
| 15 | (Thailand) Chiang Mai University | Thailand | - | - | - | - | - | - | 236 | 258 |

=== QS World University Rankings: Employer ===
| Top 10 | University | Country | 2024 | 2025 | 2026 | 2027 |
|---|---|---|---|---|---|---|
| 1 | National University of Singapore | Singapore | 54 | 48 | 32 | 26 |
| 2 | (Singapore) Nanyang Technological University | Singapore | 115 | 92 | 67 | 48 |
| 3 | (Malaysia) Universiti Malaya | Malaysia | 34 | 34 | 40 | 61 |
| 4 | Universitas Indonesia | Indonesia | 91 | 79 | 76 | 82 |
| 5 | (Indonesia) Gadjah Mada University | Indonesia | 118 | 91 | 93 | 100 |
| 6 | (Indonesia) Airlangga University | Indonesia | 95 | 80 | 78 | 102 |
| 7 | (Indonesia) Bandung Institute of Technology | Indonesia | 122 | 95 | 90 | 113 |
| 8 | (Malaysia) Taylor's University | Malaysia | 67 | 72 | 92 | 115 |
| 9 | Universiti Sains Malaysia | Malaysia | 86 | 103 | 104 | 141 |
| 10 | University of the Philippines | Philippines | - | - | - | 154 |

=== QS World University Rankings: Employment Outcomes ===
| Top 10 | University | Country | 2024 | 2025 | 2026 | 2027 |
|---|---|---|---|---|---|---|
| 1 | National University of Singapore | Singapore | 7 | 6 | 9 | 9 |
| 2 | (Thailand) Chulalongkorn University | Thailand | 44 | 60 | 64 | 73 |
| 3 | (Singapore) Nanyang Technological University | Singapore | 79 | 104 | 121 | 123 |
| 4 | (Thailand) Thammasat University | Thailand | 64 | 103 | 100 | 130 |
| 5 | (Philippines) Ateneo de Manila University | Philippines | 115 | 156 | 157 | 143 |
| 6 | Universitas Indonesia | Indonesia | 103 | 131 | 124 | 158 |
| 7 | (Malaysia) Universiti Malaya | Malaysia | 286 | 183 | 167 | 184 |
| 8 | University of the Philippines | Philippines | 213 | 177 | 155 | 193 |
| 9 | (Indonesia) Gadjah Mada University | Indonesia | 169 | 167 | 177 | 223 |
| 10 | (Indonesia) Bandung Institute of Technology (ITB) | Indonesia | - | - | - | 249 |

=== QS World University Rankings: Sustainability ===
| Top 10 | University | Country | 2023 | 2024 | 2025 |
|---|---|---|---|---|---|
| 1 | National University of Singapore | Singapore | 81 | 26 | 26 |
| 2 | (Singapore) Nanyang Technological University | Singapore | 129 | 50 | 50 |
| 3 | (Malaysia) Universiti Malaya | Malaysia | 26 | 132 | 132 |
| 4 | (Thailand) Chulalongkorn University | Thailand | 151-160 | 197 | 198 |
| 5 | Universiti Sains Malaysia | Malaysia | 136 | 214 | 214 |
| 6 | University of the Philippines | Philippines | 401-450 | 231 | 230 |
| 7 | Universiti Kebangsaan Malaysia | Malaysia | 381-400 | 244 | 243 |
| 8 | (Thailand) Mahidol University | Thailand | 501-550 | 277 | 276 |
| 9 | (Thailand) Chiang Mai University | Thailand | 301-320 | 283 | 282 |
| 10 | Universiti Putra Malaysia | Malaysia | 401-450 | 296 | 295 |

=== QS World University Rankings by Subject: Art & Humanity ===
| Top 10 | University | Country | 2018 | 2019 | 2020 | 2021 | 2022 | 2023 | 2024 | 2025 | 2026 |
|---|---|---|---|---|---|---|---|---|---|---|---|
| 1 | National University of Singapore | Singapore | 18 | 14 | 19 | 15 | 12 | 47 | 37 | 31 | 17 |
| 2 | (Singapore) Nanyang Technological University | Singapore | 61 | 59 | 61 | 41 | 35 | 88 | 66 | 48 | 40 |
| 3 | (Malaysia) University of Malaya | Malaysia | 65 | 99 | 105 | 105 | 84 | 109 | 94 | 98 | 91 |
| 4 | (Thailand) Chulalongkorn University | Thailand | 197 | 253 | 215 | 242 | 167 | 190 | 171 | 174 | 118 |
| 5 | (Malaysia) UCSI University | Malaysia | - | - | - | - | - | - | - | 76 | 157 |
| 6 | Universitas Indonesia | Indonesia | 257 | 278 | 286 | 287 | 200 | 224 | 220 | 190 | 168 |
| 7 | Universiti Sains Malaysia | Malaysia | 91 | 212 | 250 | 304 | 274 | 340 | 218 | 207 | 181 |
| 8 | (Indonesia) Gadjah Mada University | Indonesia | - | - | 274 | 350 | 213 | 236 | 272 | 223 | 189 |
| 9 | Universiti Kebangsaan Malaysia | Malaysia | 113 | 168 | 238 | 258 | 248 | 297 | 225 | 218 | 212 |
| 10 | (Malaysia) Taylor's University | Malaysia | - | - | - | - | 363 | 359 | 228 | 148 | 221 |

=== QS World University Rankings by Subject: Engineering & Technology ===
| Top 10 | University | Country | 2018 | 2019 | 2020 | 2021 | 2022 | 2023 | 2024 | 2025 | 2026 |
|---|---|---|---|---|---|---|---|---|---|---|---|
| 1 | National University of Singapore | Singapore | 7 | 8 | 10 | 9 | 7 | 16 | 15 | 12 | 8 |
| 2 | (Singapore) Nanyang Technological University | Singapore | 5 | 6 | 8 | 4 | 4 | 14 | 13 | 11 | 10 |
| 3 | (Malaysia) University of Malaya | Malaysia | 22 | 38 | 55 | 54 | 45 | 65 | 62 | 79 | 82 |
| 4 | Universiti Teknologi Malaysia | Malaysia | 53 | 85 | 100 | 104 | 74 | 99 | 105 | 102 | 86 |
| 5 | (Malaysia) Universiti Teknologi Petronas | Malaysia | 145 | 221 | 259 | 230 | 159 | 200 | 175 | 184 | 146 |
| 6 | Universiti Sains Malaysia | Malaysia | 60 | 135 | 179 | 199 | 167 | 208 | 186 | 177 | 157 |
| 7 | Universiti Kebangsaan Malaysia | Malaysia | 88 | 123 | 179 | 194 | 150 | 206 | 173 | 197 | 162 |
| 8 | Universiti Putra Malaysia | Malaysia | 86 | 142 | 210 | 224 | 185 | 195 | 186 | 177 | 176 |
| 9 | (Thailand) Chulalongkorn University | Thailand | 140 | 191 | 227 | 244 | 240 | 270 | 222 | 197 | 194 |
| 10 | (Indonesia) Bandung Institute of Technology | Indonesia | 169 | 243 | 244 | 256 | 179 | 224 | 320 | 282 | 216 |

=== QS World University Rankings by Subject: Life Science and Medicine ===
| Top 10 | University | Country | 2018 | 2019 | 2020 | 2021 | 2022 | 2023 | 2024 | 2025 | 2026 |
|---|---|---|---|---|---|---|---|---|---|---|---|
| 1 | National University of Singapore | Singapore | 22 | 26 | 25 | 27 | 21 | 33 | 31 | 29 | 14 |
| 2 | (Singapore) Nanyang Technological University | Singapore | 130 | 141 | 144 | 119 | 81 | 136 | 117 | 109 | 84 |
| 3 | (Thailand) Mahidol University | Thailand | 122 | 148 | 143 | 142 | 118 | 125 | 110 | 106 | 113 |
| 4 | (Malaysia) University of Malaya | Malaysia | 154 | 182 | 174 | 179 | 138 | 148 | 133 | 118 | 121 |
| 5 | Universiti Putra Malaysia | Malaysia | 249 | 326 | 311 | 314 | 235 | 249 | 176 | 158 | 154 |
| 6 | (Thailand) Chulalongkorn University | Thailand | 215 | 267 | 282 | 299 | 235 | 232 | 183 | 169 | 157 |
| 7 | Universiti Sains Malaysia | Malaysia | 234 | 326 | 355 | 363 | 268 | 268 | 239 | 213 | 185 |
| 8 | Universiti Kebangsaan Malaysia | Malaysia | 280 | 360 | 371 | 358 | 323 | 291 | 275 | 234 | 192 |
| 9 | (Thailand) Chiang Mai University | Thailand | 369 | 401-450 | 401-450 | 385 | 353 | 362 | 313 | 294 | 274 |
| 10 | Universitas Indonesia | Indonesia | 451-500 | 451-500 | 451-500 | 401-450 | 348 | 354 | 349 | 331 | 281 |

=== QS World University Rankings by Subject: Natural Science ===
| Top 10 | University | Country | 2018 | 2019 | 2020 | 2021 | 2022 | 2023 | 2024 | 2025 | 2026 |
|---|---|---|---|---|---|---|---|---|---|---|---|
| 1 | National University of Singapore | Singapore | 12 | 12 | 14 | 14 | 15 | 43 | 29 | 21 | 13 |
| 2 | (Singapore) Nanyang Technological University | Singapore | 19 | 17 | 19 | 12 | 13 | 46 | 37 | 24 | 18 |
| 3 | (Malaysia) University of Malaya | Malaysia | 141 | 137 | 156 | 166 | 113 | 150 | 154 | 134 | 142 |
| 4 | Universiti Kebangsaan Malaysia | Malaysia | 317 | 294 | 345 | 396 | 327 | 341 | 284 | 243 | 195 |
| 5 | Universiti Teknologi Malaysia | Malaysia | 311 | 289 | 302 | 272 | 244 | 280 | 244 | 227 | 197 |
| 6 | Universiti Sains Malaysia | Malaysia | 197 | 223 | 295 | 327 | 268 | 312 | 241 | 219 | 201 |
| 6 | Universiti Putra Malaysia | Malaysia | 215 | 231 | 281 | 244 | 251 | 289 | 227 | 200 | 201 |
| 8 | (Thailand) Chulalongkorn University | Thailand | 266 | 274 | 266 | 284 | 226 | 265 | 293 | 250 | 248 |
| 9 | (Malaysia) Universiti Teknologi Petronas | Malaysia | - | - | - | - | - | - | 401-450 | 362 | 341 |
| 10 | (Indonesia) Bandung Institute of Technology | Indonesia | - | 451-500 | 390 | 451-500 | 372 | 451-500 | 451-500 | 401-450 | 374 |

=== QS World University Rankings by Subject: Social Science Management ===
| Top 10 | University | Country | 2018 | 2019 | 2020 | 2021 | 2022 | 2023 | 2024 | 2025 | 2026 |
|---|---|---|---|---|---|---|---|---|---|---|---|
| 1 | National University of Singapore | Singapore | 7 | 9 | 12 | 9 | 7 | 18 | 14 | 10 | 8 |
| 2 | (Singapore) Nanyang Technological University | Singapore | 29 | 19 | 23 | 17 | 11 | 35 | 29 | 21 | 21 |
| 3 | (Malaysia) University of Malaya | Malaysia | 45 | 55 | 74 | 85 | 50 | 77 | 65 | 71 | 72 |
| 4 | Singapore Management University | Singapore | 77 | 79 | 94 | 76 | 68 | 171 | - | 175 | 86 |
| 5 | (Thailand) Chulalongkorn University | Thailand | 139 | 194 | 192 | 202 | 162 | 188 | 145 | 148 | 141 |
| 6 | Universiti Kebangsaan Malaysia | Malaysia | 92 | 134 | 207 | 243 | 192 | 194 | 161 | 179 | 146 |
| 6 | Universitas Indonesia | Indonesia | 218 | 215 | 203 | 218 | 112 | 152 | 151 | 176 | 146 |
| 8 | (Malaysia) Taylor's University | Malaysia | 385 | 395 | 400 | 257 | 138 | 164 | 169 | 135 | 166 |
| 9 | Universiti Sains Malaysia | Malaysia | 63 | 144 | 214 | 225 | 179 | 202 | 183 | 176 | 166 |
| 10 | Universiti Putra Malaysia | Malaysia | 99 | 166 | 199 | 232 | 178 | 178 | 174 | 183 | 170 |

=== QS Asian University Rankings ===
| Top 30 | University | 2018 | 2019 | 2020 | 2021 | 2022 | 2023 | 2024 | 2025 | 2026 | 2027 |
|---|---|---|---|---|---|---|---|---|---|---|---|
| 1 | National University of Singapore | 2 | 1 | 1 | 1 | 1 | 2 | 3 | 3 | 3 | 6 |
| 2 | (Singapore) Nanyang Technological University | 1 | 3 | 2 | 3 | 3 | 5 | 4 | 4 | 3 | 8 |
| 3 | (Malaysia) Universiti Malaya | 24 | 19 | 13 | 9 | 8 | 9 | 11 | 12 | 15 | 17 |
| 4 | Universiti Kebangsaan Malaysia | 43 | 41 | 39 | 35 | 33 | 30 | 28 | 26 | 24 | 20 |
| 5 | Universiti Putra Malaysia | 36 | 34 | 33 | 28 | 27 | 27 | 25 | 20 | 22 | 24 |
| 6 | Universiti Teknologi Malaysia | 49 | 47 | 46 | 39 | 38 | 39 | 37 | 28 | 25 | 25 |
| 7 | Universiti Sains Malaysia | 46 | 43 | 37 | 34 | 35 | 32 | 35 | 37 | 34 | 27 |
| 8 | (Malaysia) Taylor's University | - | - | 109 | 89 | 59 | 49 | 41 | 36 | 27 | 32 |
| 9 | (Malaysia) UCSI University | - | - | 122 | 105 | 77 | 72 | 61 | 45 | 30 | 36 |
| 10 | (Malaysia) Sunway University | - | - | 194 | 172 | 121 | 122 | 103 | 74 | 55 | 47 |
| 11 | (Malaysia) Universiti Teknologi Petronas | - | - | 82 | 70 | 72 | 68 | 69 | 53 | 44 | 51 |
| 12 | (Thailand) Chulalongkorn University | 50 | 45 | 45 | 43 | 36 | 37 | 44 | 47 | 52 | 52 |
| 13 | (Indonesia) Gadjah Mada University | - | - | 70 | 57 | 59 | 56 | 54 | 53 | 55 | 53 |
| 14 | (Indonesia) Airlangga University | - | - | 171 | 124 | 110 | 81 | 67 | 52 | 54 | 55 |
| 15 | Universitas Indonesia | - | - | 59 | 59 | 46 | 49 | 48 | 46 | 47 | 56 |
| 16 | (Thailand) Mahidol University | - | - | 48 | 44 | 43 | 57 | 51 | 55 | 55 | 58 |
| 17 | (Indonesia) Bandung Institute of Technology | - | - | 66 | 62 | 67 | 63 | 60 | 59 | 62 | 67 |
| 18 | Universiti Utara Malaysia | - | - | 116 | 107 | 98 | 108 | 101 | 79 | 65 | 82 |
| 19 | Universiti Brunei Darussalam | - | - | 86 | 75 | 69 | 71 | 72 | 78 | 67 | 83 |
| 20 | (Malaysia) INTI | - | - | - | - | - | - | - | - | - | 86 |
| 21 | (Singapore) SUTD | - | - | - | - | - | - | - | - | - | 88 |
| 22 | (Singapore) SMU | - | - | - | - | - | - | - | - | - | 90 |
| 23 | (Indonesia) IPB University | - | - | 132 | 118 | 112 | 112 | 106 | 92 | 82 | 100 |
| 24 | (Indonesia) Universitas Padjadjaran | - | - | 236 | 238 | 192 | 191 | 160 | 134 | 96 | 101 |
| 25 | (Indonesia) Institut Teknologi Sepuluh Nopember | - | - | 198 | 164 | 160 | 146 | 128 | 114 | 97 | 105 |
| 26 | (Malaysia) UTAR | - | - | - | - | - | - | - | - | - | 109 |
| 27 | (Thailand) Chiang Mai University | - | - | - | - | - | - | - | - | 105 | 112 |
| 28 | (Malaysia) UiTM | - | - | - | - | - | - | - | - | - | 114 |
| 29 | (Indonesia) Diponegoro University | - | - | - | - | - | - | - | - | 106 | 116 |
| 30 | (Indonesia) Brawijaya University | - | - | - | - | - | - | - | - | - | 119 |

== Times Higher Education Rankings ==
=== Times Higher Education World University Rankings ===
| Top 10 | University | Country | 2018 | 2019 | 2020 | 2021 | 2023 | 2024 | 2025 |
|---|---|---|---|---|---|---|---|---|---|
| 1 | National University of Singapore | Singapore | 22 | 23 | 25 | 25 | 19 | 19 | 17 |
| 2 | (Singapore) Nanyang Technological University | Singapore | 52 | 51 | 48 | 47 | 36 | 32 | 30 |
| 3 | (Malaysia) Universiti Teknologi Petronas | Malaysia | 601-800 | 601-800 | 601-800 | 601-800 | 401-500 | 301-350 | 201-250 |
| 4 | (Malaysia) University of Malaya | Malaysia | 351-400 | 301-350 | 301-350 | 301-350 | 351-400 | 251-300 | 251-300 |
| 5 | (Malaysia) Sunway University | Malaysia | - | - | - | - | - | - | 401-500 |
| 6 | Universiti Kebangsaan Malaysia | Malaysia | 601-800 | 601-800 | 601-800 | 601-800 | 601-800 | 401-500 | 401-500 |
| 7 | Universiti Sains Malaysia | Malaysia | - | - | - | - | - | 401-500 | 401-500 |
| 8 | Universiti Teknologi Malaysia | Malaysia | - | - | - | - | - | 401-500 | 401-500 |
| 9 | Universiti Utara Malaysia | Malaysia | - | - | - | - | - | - | 401-500 |
| 10 | (Vietnam) University of Economics Ho Chi Minh City | Vietnam | - | - | - | - | - | - | 501-600 |

=== Times Higher Interdisciplinary Science Rankings ===
| Top 10 | University | Country | 2025 | 2026 | 2027 |
|---|---|---|---|---|---|
| 1 | National University of Singapore | Singapore | 3 | 8 | 2 |
| 2 | (Singapore) Nanyang Technological University | Singapore | 9 | 5 | 7 |
| 3 | (Thailand) Chulalongkorn University | Thailand | 40 | 19 | 20 |
| 4 | (Indonesia) IPB University | Indonesia | 60 | 42 | 47 |
| 5 | Universiti Teknologi Malaysia | Malaysia | 35 | 51 | 54 |
| 6 | (Indonesia) Bandung Institute of Technology | Indonesia | 108 | 73 | 56 |
| 7 | (Thailand) Mahidol University | Thailand | 71 | 31 | 73 |
| 8 | (Indonesia) Gadjah Mada University | Indonesia | - | 89 | 74 |
| 9 | Universiti Kebangsaan Malaysia | Malaysia | 46 | 61 | 76 |
| 10 | Universitas Indonesia | Indonesia | 65 | 76 | 77 |

=== Times Higher Global Employability University Ranking ===
| Top 10 | University | Country | 2025 | 2026 | 2027 |
|---|---|---|---|---|---|
| 1 | National University of Singapore | Singapore | 9 | 8 | 8 |
| 2 | (Singapore) Nanyang Technological University | Singapore | 33 | 23 | 24 |
| 3 | (Malaysia) Universiti Malaya | Malaysia | - | - | 244 |
| 4 | Universitas Indonesia | Indonesia | 248 | 240 | 257 |
| 5 | (Indonesia) Bandung Institute of Technology | Indonesia | - | 246 | 267 |
| 6 | (Thailand) Chulalongkorn University | Thailand | - | 245 | 271 |
| 7 | Universiti Teknologi Malaysia | Malaysia | - | - | 285 |

=== Times Higher Education University Impact Rankings ===
| Top 10 | University | Country | 2019 | 2020 | 2021 | 2022 | 2023 | 2024 | 2025 | 2026 |
|---|---|---|---|---|---|---|---|---|---|---|
| 1 | Universiti Sains Malaysia | Malaysia | 49 | 65 | 39 | 4 | 4 | 18 | 14 | 5 |
| 2 | Universiti Kebangsaan Malaysia | Malaysia | - | - | - | - | - | - | 53 | 7 |
| 3 | (Indonesia) Airlangga University | Indonesia | - | - | - | - | 101-200 | 81 | 9 | 15 |
| 4 | (Thailand) Chulalongkorn University | Thailand | - | 101-200 | 23 | 16 | 17 | 43 | 44 | 19 |
| 5 | (Malaysia) Universiti Malaya | Malaysia | - | - | - | - | - | 61 | 25 | 24 |
| 6 | Universitas Indonesia | Indonesia | 80 | 47 | 85 | 18 | 20 | 31 | 30 | 31 |
| 7 | (Indonesia) Gadjah Mada University | Indonesia | 101-200 | 72 | 83 | 87 | 101-200 | 101-200 | 82 | 41 |
| 8 | (Malaysia) Sunway University | Malaysia | - | - | - | - | - | - | 81 | 45 |
| 9 | (Thailand) Thammasat University | Thailand | - | - | - | - | - | 81 | 64 | 46 |
| 10 | (Thailand) Walailak University | Thailand | - | - | - | - | - | - | - | 47 |

=== Times Higher Education Asia University Rankings ===
| Top 10 | University | 2018 | 2019 | 2020 | 2021 | 2022 | 2023 |
|---|---|---|---|---|---|---|---|
| 1 | National University of Singapore | 1 | 2 | 3 | 3 | 3 | 3 |
| 2 | (Singapore) Nanyang Technological University | 5 | 6 | 6 | 5 | 5 | 5 |
| 3 | Universiti Brunei Darussalam | - | - | 60 | 60 | 62 | 60 |
| 4 | (Malaysia) Universiti Teknologi Petronas | 114 | 98 | 124 | 111 | 95 | 63 |
| 5 | (Malaysia) University of Malaya | 46 | 38 | 43 | 49 | 55 | 66 |
| 6 | (Vietnam) Ton Duc Thang University | 175 | 170 | 160 | 150 | 73 | 86 |
| 7 | (Vietnam) Duy Tan University | 175 | 170 | 160 | 150 | 91 | 106 |
| 8 | Universiti Kebangsaan Malaysia | 175 | 170 | 160 | 150 | 138 | 149 |
| 9 | Universiti Putra Malaysia | 142 | 188 | 145 | 136 | 142 | 154 |
| 10 | Universiti Teknologi Malaysia | 129 | 125 | 143 | 150 | 160 | 161 |

== SCImago Institutions Rankings ==
Note: (Note: Including Institutions from Government, Health, Universities, Companies, Non-Profil)

=== SCImago Institutions Rankings : Overall ===
| Top 10 | University | Country | 2020 | 2021 | 2022 | 2023 | 2024 | |
| Top 10 | University | Country | 2020 | 2021 | 2022 | 2023 | All Institutions | Only University |
|---|---|---|---|---|---|---|---|---|
| 1 | National University of Singapore | Singapore | 59 | 52 | 49 | 53 | 52 | 25 |
| 2 | (Singapore) Nanyang Technological University | Singapore | 90 | 86 | 96 | 101 | 113 | 57 |
| 3 | (Singapore) Ngee Ann Polytechnic | Singapore | 1100 | - | 1129 | 505 | 715 | 314 |
| 4 | (Singapore) SUTD | Singapore | 1248 | 1111 | 1083 | 827 | 832 | 361 |
| 5 | Universiti Sains Malaysia | Malaysia | 1281 | 1178 | 872 | 936 | 909 | 400 |
| 6 | Universiti Putra Malaysia | Malaysia | 1030 | 966 | 788 | 868 | 913 | 402 |
| 7 | (Malaysia) Universiti Malaya | Malaysia | 467 | 529 | 689 | 837 | 954 | 421 |
| 8 | (Thailand) Chulalongkorn University | Thailand | 1339 | 1235 | 1251 | 1355 | 1027 | 452 |
| 9 | Universitas Indonesia | Indonesia | 2582 | 2365 | 1580 | 1531 | 1049 | 457 |
| 10 | (Thailand) Mahidol University | Thailand | 1473 | 1409 | 1394 | 1744 | 1100 | 479 |

=== SCImago Institutions Rankings : Research ===
| Top 10 | University | Country | 2020 | 2021 | 2022 | 2023 | 2024 |
|---|---|---|---|---|---|---|---|
| 1 | National University of Singapore | Singapore | 44 | 40 | 43 | 44 | 48 |
| 2 | (Singapore) Nanyang Technological University | Singapore | 74 | 79 | 104 | 108 | 124 |
| 3 | Universiti Sains Malaysia | Malaysia | 601 | 387 | 327 | 316 | 297 |
| 4 | Universiti Putra Malaysia | Malaysia | 422 | 334 | 326 | 324 | 328 |
| 5 | Universiti Kebangsaan Malaysia | Malaysia | 571 | 481 | 332 | 547 | 464 |
| 6 | (Malaysia) Universiti Malaya | Malaysia | 233 | 252 | 528 | 418 | 491 |
| 7 | (Vietnam) Ton Duc Thang University | Vietnam | 2348 | 834 | 561 | 413 | 621 |
| 8 | Universitas Indonesia | Indonesia | 1087 | 779 | 663 | 648 | 645 |
| 9 | (Thailand) Chulalongkorn University | Thailand | 1295 | 878 | 895 | 998 | 749 |
| 10 | Universiti Teknologi Malaysia | Malaysia | 417 | 429 | 675 | 813 | 804 |

=== SCImago Institutions Rankings : Societal ===
| Top 10 | University | Country | 2020 | 2021 | 2022 | 2023 | 2024 |
|---|---|---|---|---|---|---|---|
| 1 | National University of Singapore | Singapore | 90 | 84 | 78 | 84 | 68 |
| 2 | (Singapore) Nanyang Technological University | Singapore | 216 | 186 | 174 | 182 | 217 |
| 3 | Universitas Indonesia | Indonesia | 1118 | 1099 | 789 | 717 | 304 |
| 4 | (Thailand) Mahidol University | Thailand | 626 | 637 | 585 | 611 | 352 |
| 5 | (Indonesia) Gadjah Mada University | Indonesia | 1480 | 1560 | 1266 | 1055 | 470 |
| 6 | (Thailand) Chulalongkorn University | Thailand | 565 | 592 | 612 | 627 | 534 |
| 7 | (Indonesia) Airlangga University | Indonesia | 2772 | 2461 | 1800 | 1643 | 566 |
| 8 | (Malaysia) Universiti Malaya | Malaysia | 341 | 333 | 462 | 492 | 615 |
| 9 | (Malaysia) Universiti Teknologi MARA | Malaysia | 1068 | 1334 | 1297 | 1367 | 624 |
| 10 | (Indonesia) Brawijaya University | Indonesia | 2443 | 2461 | 1515 | 1440 | 730 |

== Edurank University Rankings ==
| Top 50 | University | Country | 2022 | 2023 | 2024 | 2025 | 2026 |
|---|---|---|---|---|---|---|---|
| 1 | National University of Singapore | Singapore | 85 | 80 | 81 | 75 | 75 |
| 2 | (Singapore) Nanyang Technological University | Singapore | 200 | 191 | 196 | 201 | 195 |
| 3 | Universitas Indonesia | Indonesia | 586 | 531 | 460 | 441 | 444 |
| 4 | (Thailand) Chulalongkorn University | Thailand | 487 | 476 | 459 | 462 | 446 |
| 5 | (Malaysia) Universiti Malaya | Malaysia | 486 | 464 | 462 | 463 | 447 |
| 6 | (Thailand) Mahidol University | Thailand | 505 | 475 | 469 | 468 | 476 |
| 7 | (Indonesia) Gadjah Mada University | Indonesia | 694 | 655 | 588 | 564 | 539 |
| 8 | Universiti Putra Malaysia | Malaysia | 734 | 708 | 675 | 648 | 629 |
| 9 | Universiti Kebangsaan Malaysia | Malaysia | 705 | 677 | 645 | 616 | 632 |
| 10 | Universiti Sains Malaysia | Malaysia | 693 | 703 | 688 | 659 | 644 |
| 11 | (Indonesia) Bandung Institute of Technology | Indonesia | 919 | 787 | 740 | 705 | 717 |
| 12 | Universiti Teknologi Malaysia | Malaysia | 805 | 748 | 742 | 709 | 720 |
| 13 | (Thailand) Chiang Mai University | Thailand | 813 | 736 | 730 | 734 | 788 |
| 14 | (Malaysia) Universiti Teknologi MARA | Malaysia | 927 | 888 | 815 | 827 | 830 |
| 15 | (Indonesia) Diponegoro University | Indonesia | - | 990 | 858 | 826 | 831 |
| 16 | (Indonesia) IPB University | Indonesia | 1022 | 907 | 887 | 848 | 860 |
| 17 | (Indonesia) Airlangga University | Indonesia | - | 1043 | 915 | 872 | 873 |
| 18 | (Indonesia) Padjadjaran University | Indonesia | 1146 | 1004 | 859 | 829 | 886 |
| 19 | (Thailand) Kasetsart University | Thailand | 940 | 899 | 892 | 902 | 907 |
| 20 | Singapore Management University | Singapore | 939 | 1007 | 1000 | 1016 | 916 |
| 21 | (Indonesia) Brawijaya University | Indonesia | - | 1064 | 902 | 914 | 918 |
| 22 | (Indonesia) Sebelas Maret University | Indonesia | - | - | 1084 | 1039 | 1053 |
| 23 | (Thailand) Thammasat University | Thailand | - | - | 1090 | 1108 | 1055 |
| 24 | (Thailand) Khon Kaen University | Thailand | 994 | 986 | 979 | 993 | 1061 |
| 25 | International Islamic University Malaysia | Malaysia | - | - | 1140 | 1159 | 1109 |
| 26 | (Thailand) Prince of Songkla University | Thailand | 1066 | 980 | 983 | 995 | 1126 |
| 27 | (Indonesia) Hasanuddin University | Indonesia | - | - | 1264 | 1225 | 1175 |
| 28 | Indonesia University of Education | Indonesia | - | - | 1184 | 1204 | 1200 |
| 29 | (Indonesia) Sepuluh Nopember Institute of Technology | Indonesia | - | - | 1282 | 1302 | 1229 |
| 30 | University of the Philippines Diliman | Philippines | - | - | 1348 | 1364 | 1299 |
| 31 | (Indonesia) Andalas University | Indonesia | - | - | 1465 | 1366 | 1303 |
| 32 | (Indonesia) Udayana University | Indonesia | - | - | 1364 | 1315 | 1313 |
| 33 | (Indonesia) Bina Nusantara University | Indonesia | - | - | 1461 | 1420 | 1317 |
| 34 | (Indonesia) State University of Padang | Indonesia | - | - | 1550 | 1574 | 1319 |
| 35 | (Indonesia) Telkom University | Indonesia | - | - | - | 1470 | 1346 |
| 36 | (Indonesia) University of North Sumatra | Indonesia | - | - | 1415 | 1369 | 1351 |
| 37 | Vietnam National University, Hanoi | Vietnam | - | - | 1487 | 1441 | 1357 |
| 38 | (Indonesia) Yogyakarta State University | Indonesia | - | - | 1429 | 1447 | 1378 |
| 39 | (Indonesia) State University of Malang | Indonesia | - | - | 1410 | 1422 | 1400 |
| 40 | (Indonesia) State University of Semarang | Indonesia | - | - | 1427 | 1445 | 1408 |
| 41 | (Indonesia) Lampung University | Indonesia | - | - | - | 1519 | 1440 |
| 42 | Singapore University of Technology and Design | Singapore | - | - | - | - | 1482 |
| 43 | (Thailand) King Mongkut's University of Technology Thonburi | Thailand | - | - | 1515 | 1463 | 1487 |
| 44 | (Thailand) Asian Institute of Technology | Thailand | - | - | 1498 | 1448 | 1508 |
| 45 | (Indonesia) Sriwijaya University | Indonesia | - | - | - | - | 1558 |
| 46 | (Vietnam) Hanoi University of Science and Technology | Vietnam | - | - | - | - | 1564 |
| 47 | (Thailand) King Mongkut's Institute of Technology Ladkrabang | Thailand | - | - | - | - | 1567 |
| 48 | (Philippines) De La Salle University | Philippines | - | - | - | - | 1569 |
| 49 | (Indonesia) State University of Surabaya | Indonesia | - | - | - | - | 1605 |
| 50 | Northern University of Malaysia | Malaysia | - | - | - | - | 1608 |

=== Edurank : Art & Designs ===
| Top 20 | University | Country | 2024 | 2025 | 2026 |
|---|---|---|---|---|---|
| 1 | National University of Singapore | Singapore | 45 | 44 | 44 |
| 2 | (Singapore) Nanyang Technological University | Singapore | 80 | 81 | 82 |
| 3 | (Malaysia) Universiti Malaya | Malaysia | 376 | 346 | 339 |
| 4 | Universiti Sains Malaysia | Malaysia | 460 | 416 | 412 |
| 5 | Universiti Kebangsaan Malaysia | Malaysia | 518 | 421 | 420 |
| 6 | Universiti Teknologi Malaysia | Malaysia | 465 | 432 | 428 |
| 7 | Universiti Putra Malaysia | Malaysia | 539 | 450 | 447 |
| 8 | (Malaysia) Universiti Teknologi MARA | Malaysia | - | 462 | 457 |
| 9 | Universitas Indonesia | Indonesia | 737 | 543 | 539 |
| 10 | Indonesia University of Education | Indonesia | - | 599 | 599 |
| 11 | (Indonesia) Gadjah Mada University | Indonesia | 822 | 603 | 600 |
| 12 | (Indonesia) Sebelas Maret University | Indonesia | - | 626 | 630 |
| 13 | (Indonesia) State University of Malang | Indonesia | - | 628 | 632 |
| 14 | (Indonesia) State University of Padang | Indonesia | - | 687 | 691 |
| 15 | (Indonesia) Yogyakarta State University | Indonesia | - | 691 | 693 |
| 16 | (Thailand) Chulalongkorn University | Thailand | 774 | 739 | 730 |
| 17 | (Indonesia) Bina Nusantara University | Indonesia | - | 751 | 738 |
| 18 | (Indonesia) Diponegoro University | Indonesia | 949 | 754 | 755 |
| 19 | (Indonesia) Bandung Institute of Technology | Indonesia | 854 | 764 | 766 |
| 20 | (Indonesia) Sunan Kalijaga State Islamic University | Indonesia | - | 779 | 794 |

=== Edurank : Biology ===
| Top 20 | University | Country | 2024 | 2025 | 2026 |
|---|---|---|---|---|---|
| 1 | National University of Singapore | Singapore | 63 | 65 | 65 |
| 2 | (Singapore) Nanyang Technological University | Singapore | 155 | 160 | 159 |
| 3 | (Thailand) Mahidol University | Thailand | 340 | 319 | 318 |
| 4 | (Malaysia) Universiti Malaya | Malaysia | 374 | 357 | 355 |
| 5 | Universiti Putra Malaysia | Malaysia | 446 | 388 | 383 |
| 6 | Universiti Sains Malaysia | Malaysia | 453 | 423 | 424 |
| 7 | (Thailand) Chulalongkorn University | Thailand | 451 | 426 | 427 |
| 8 | Universiti Kebangsaan Malaysia | Malaysia | 621 | 555 | 546 |
| 9 | Universiti Teknologi Malaysia | Malaysia | 652 | 619 | 610 |
| 10 | (Thailand) Chiang Mai University | Thailand | 698 | 666 | 660 |
| 11 | (Indonesia) IPB University | Indonesia | 930 | 699 | 708 |
| 12 | (Indonesia) Gadjah Mada University | Indonesia | 822 | 735 | 735 |
| 13 | Universitas Indonesia | Indonesia | 737 | 754 | 746 |
| 14 | (Thailand) Prince of Songkla University | Thailand | 846 | 767 | 754 |
| 15 | (Thailand) Khon Kaen University | Thailand | 830 | 798 | 791 |
| 16 | (Indonesia) Diponegoro University | Indonesia | 1095 | 847 | 855 |
| 17 | (Thailand) Kasetsart University | Thailand | 940 | 911 | 902 |
| 18 | (Indonesia) Padjadjaran University | Indonesia | 1299 | 972 | 946 |
| 19 | (Malaysia) Universiti Teknologi MARA | Malaysia | - | 958 | 947 |
| 20 | (Indonesia) Brawijaya University | Indonesia | 1259 | 960 | 960 |

=== Edurank : Business ===
| Top 20 | University | Country | 2024 | 2025 | 2026 |
|---|---|---|---|---|---|
| 1 | National University of Singapore | Singapore | 25 | 30 | 30 |
| 2 | (Singapore) Nanyang Technological University | Singapore | 51 | 55 | 54 |
| 3 | Universiti Teknologi Malaysia | Malaysia | 316 | 263 | 259 |
| 4 | (Malaysia) Universiti Malaya | Malaysia | 292 | 265 | 264 |
| 5 | (Malaysia) Universiti Teknologi MARA | Malaysia | - | 269 | 266 |
| 6 | Universitas Indonesia | Indonesia | 570 | 351 | 342 |
| 7 | Universiti Kebangsaan Malaysia | Malaysia | 451 | 353 | 347 |
| 8 | Universiti Putra Malaysia | Malaysia | 467 | 359 | 354 |
| 9 | Universiti Sains Malaysia | Malaysia | 471 | 375 | 364 |
| 10 | Singapore Management University | Singapore | 460 | 437 | 436 |
| 11 | Universiti Utara Malaysia | Malaysia | - | 444 | 439 |
| 12 | (Indonesia) Udayana University | Indonesia | - | 450 | 457 |
| 13 | (Indonesia) Diponegoro University | Indonesia | 818 | 503 | 499 |
| 14 | (Indonesia) Bandung Institute of Technology | Indonesia | 685 | 533 | 528 |
| 15 | (Indonesia) Brawijaya University | Indonesia | 908 | 539 | 533 |
| 16 | (Indonesia) Bina Nusantara University | Indonesia | - | 581 | 552 |
| 17 | (Indonesia) Gadjah Mada University | Indonesia | 771 | 586 | 576 |
| 18 | (Indonesia) Airlangga University | Indonesia | 941 | 611 | 602 |
| 19 | (Indonesia) Telkom University | Indonesia | - | 617 | 610 |
| 20 | International Islamic University Malaysia | Malaysia | - | 637 | 635 |

=== Edurank : Chemistry ===
| Top 20 | University | Country | 2024 | 2025 | 2026 |
|---|---|---|---|---|---|
| 1 | National University of Singapore | Singapore | 37 | 39 | 39 |
| 2 | (Singapore) Nanyang Technological University | Singapore | 83 | 86 | 86 |
| 3 | (Malaysia) Universiti Malaya | Malaysia | 464 | 340 | 336 |
| 4 | Universiti Putra Malaysia | Malaysia | 708 | 377 | 368 |
| 5 | Universiti Sains Malaysia | Malaysia | 703 | 378 | 372 |
| 6 | (Thailand) Chulalongkorn University | Thailand | 476 | 469 | 464 |
| 7 | (Thailand) Mahidol University | Thailand | 475 | 493 | 489 |
| 8 | Universiti Teknologi Malaysia | Malaysia | 748 | 476 | 469 |
| 9 | Universiti Kebangsaan Malaysia | Malaysia | 677 | 522 | 511 |
| 10 | (Thailand) Chiang Mai University | Thailand | 736 | 778 | 766 |
| 11 | (Thailand) Prince of Songkla University | Thailand | 980 | 868 | 858 |
| 12 | (Malaysia) Universiti Teknologi MARA | Malaysia | - | 915 | 897 |
| 13 | (Thailand) Khon Kaen University | Thailand | 986 | 933 | 919 |
| 14 | (Thailand) Kasetsart University | Thailand | 899 | 939 | 925 |
| 15 | (Indonesia) Gadjah Mada University | Indonesia | 655 | 941 | 938 |
| 16 | Universitas Indonesia | Indonesia | 531 | 952 | 954 |
| 17 | (Malaysia) Universiti Teknologi Petronas | Malaysia | - | 1067 | 1052 |
| 18 | (Indonesia) Bandung Institute of Technology | Indonesia | 787 | 1076 | 1062 |
| 19 | (Indonesia) IPB University | Indonesia | 977 | 1080 | 1079 |
| 20 | (Thailand) King Mongkut's University of Technology Thonburi | Thailand | - | 1092 | 1093 |

=== Edurank : Computer Science ===
| Top 20 | University | Country | 2025 | 2026 |
|---|---|---|---|---|
| 1 | National University of Singapore | Singapore | 38 | 37 |
| 2 | (Singapore) Nanyang Technological University | Singapore | 56 | 55 |
| 3 | Universiti Teknologi Malaysia | Malaysia | 352 | 352 |
| 4 | (Malaysia) Universiti Malaya | Malaysia | 378 | 374 |
| 5 | Universiti Kebangsaan Malaysia | Malaysia | 471 | 456 |
| 6 | Universiti Sains Malaysia | Malaysia | 483 | 473 |
| 7 | Universiti Putra Malaysia | Malaysia | 493 | 494 |
| 8 | Universitas Indonesia | Indonesia | 581 | 585 |
| 9 | (Malaysia) Universiti Teknologi MARA | Malaysia | 613 | 609 |
| 10 | (Thailand) Mahidol University | Thailand | 662 | 652 |
| 11 | (Thailand) Chulalongkorn University | Thailand | 706 | 698 |
| 12 | (Indonesia) Bandung Institute of Technology | Indonesia | 773 | 775 |
| 13 | Singapore Management University | Singapore | 811 | 811 |
| 14 | (Malaysia) Multimedia University | Malaysia | 818 | 819 |
| 15 | Singapore University of Technology and Design | Singapore | 880 | 871 |
| 16 | (Indonesia) Gadjah Mada University | Indonesia | 888 | 877 |
| 17 | (Indonesia) Telkom University | Indonesia | 925 | 899 |
| 18 | International Islamic University Malaysia | Malaysia | 914 | 917 |
| 19 | (Indonesia) Bina Nusantara University | Indonesia | 977 | 920 |
| 20 | (Malaysia) Universiti Teknologi Petronas | Malaysia | 990 | 986 |

=== Edurank : Economics ===
| Top 20 | University | Country | 2025 | 2026 |
|---|---|---|---|---|
| 1 | National University of Singapore | Singapore | 45 | 45 |
| 2 | (Singapore) Nanyang Technological University | Singapore | 126 | 126 |
| 3 | (Malaysia) Universiti Malaya | Malaysia | 260 | 257 |
| 4 | Universitas Indonesia | Indonesia | 319 | 314 |
| 5 | (Malaysia) Universiti Teknologi MARA | Malaysia | 344 | 343 |
| 6 | Universiti Kebangsaan Malaysia | Malaysia | 359 | 351 |
| 7 | Universiti Teknologi Malaysia | Malaysia | 366 | 357 |
| 8 | Universiti Putra Malaysia | Malaysia | 373 | 361 |
| 9 | Universiti Sains Malaysia | Malaysia | 387 | 375 |
| 10 | Singapore Management University | Singapore | 386 | 387 |
| 11 | Universiti Utara Malaysia | Malaysia | 450 | 446 |
| 12 | (Indonesia) Airlangga University | Indonesia | 515 | 512 |
| 13 | (Indonesia) Gadjah Mada University | Indonesia | 520 | 515 |
| 14 | (Indonesia) Udayana University | Indonesia | 540 | 557 |
| 15 | (Indonesia) Diponegoro University | Indonesia | 557 | 563 |
| 16 | International Islamic University Malaysia | Malaysia | 576 | 579 |
| 17 | (Indonesia) Sebelas Maret University | Indonesia | 599 | 595 |
| 18 | (Indonesia) Brawijaya University | Indonesia | 654 | 650 |
| 19 | (Thailand) Mahidol University | Thailand | 674 | 665 |
| 20 | (Indonesia) Padjadjaran University | Indonesia | 687 | 673 |

=== Edurank : Engineering ===
| Top 20 | University | Country | 2025 | 2026 |
|---|---|---|---|---|
| 1 | National University of Singapore | Singapore | 22 | 21 |
| 2 | (Singapore) Nanyang Technological University | Singapore | 29 | 26 |
| 3 | Universiti Teknologi Malaysia | Malaysia | 282 | 276 |
| 4 | (Malaysia) Universiti Malaya | Malaysia | 292 | 286 |
| 5 | Universiti Sains Malaysia | Malaysia | 344 | 335 |
| 6 | Universiti Putra Malaysia | Malaysia | 363 | 359 |
| 7 | Universiti Kebangsaan Malaysia | Malaysia | 424 | 416 |
| 8 | (Thailand) Chulalongkorn University | Thailand | 531 | 529 |
| 9 | (Malaysia) Universiti Teknologi MARA | Malaysia | 647 | 642 |
| 10 | (Indonesia) Bandung Institute of Technology | Indonesia | 727 | 725 |
| 11 | (Thailand) Mahidol University | Thailand | 757 | 754 |
| 12 | Universitas Indonesia | Indonesia | 801 | 782 |
| 13 | (Malaysia) Universiti Teknologi Petronas | Malaysia | 905 | 793 |
| 14 | University of Malaysia, Pahang | Malaysia | 905 | 887 |
| 15 | (Indonesia) Gadjah Mada University | Indonesia | 917 | 912 |
| 16 | (Thailand) King Mongkut's University of Technology Thonburi | Thailand | 931 | 933 |
| 17 | (Thailand) Chiang Mai University | Thailand | 943 | 934 |
| 18 | University of Malaysia Perlis | Malaysia | 970 | 966 |
| 19 | Tun Hussein Onn University of Malaysia | Malaysia | 1038 | 1031 |
| 20 | (Indonesia) Diponegoro University | Indonesia | 1045 | 1042 |

=== Edurank : Environmental Science ===
| Top 20 | University | Country | 2025 | 2026 |
|---|---|---|---|---|
| 1 | National University of Singapore | Singapore | 47 | 46 |
| 2 | (Singapore) Nanyang Technological University | Singapore | 102 | 101 |
| 3 | (Malaysia) Universiti Malaya | Malaysia | 233 | 232 |
| 4 | Universiti Putra Malaysia | Malaysia | 288 | 285 |
| 5 | Universiti Teknologi Malaysia | Malaysia | 345 | 338 |
| 6 | Universiti Sains Malaysia | Malaysia | 346 | 340 |
| 7 | Universiti Kebangsaan Malaysia | Malaysia | 380 | 374 |
| 8 | (Thailand) Chulalongkorn University | Thailand | 510 | 510 |
| 9 | (Thailand) Mahidol University | Thailand | 535 | 532 |
| 10 | (Indonesia) IPB University | Indonesia | 541 | 537 |
| 11 | (Indonesia) Gadjah Mada University | Indonesia | 566 | 559 |
| 12 | (Indonesia) Diponegoro University | Indonesia | 612 | 610 |
| 13 | Universitas Indonesia | Indonesia | 624 | 617 |
| 14 | (Malaysia) Universiti Teknologi MARA | Malaysia | 640 | 631 |
| 15 | (Indonesia) Bandung Institute of Technology | Indonesia | 714 | 713 |
| 16 | (Thailand) Prince of Songkla University | Thailand | 748 | 733 |
| 17 | (Thailand) Chiang Mai University | Thailand | 747 | 737 |
| 18 | (Indonesia) Brawijaya University | Indonesia | 793 | 788 |
| 19 | (Thailand) Kasetsart University | Thailand | 804 | 797 |
| 20 | (Indonesia) Padjadjaran University | Indonesia | 885 | 877 |

=== Edurank : Liberal Arts & Social Sciences ===
| Top 20 | University | Country | 2025 | 2026 |
|---|---|---|---|---|
| 1 | National University of Singapore | Singapore | 71 | 70 |
| 2 | (Singapore) Nanyang Technological University | Singapore | 147 | 149 |
| 3 | Indonesia University of Education | Indonesia | 339 | 346 |
| 4 | Universitas Indonesia | Indonesia | 385 | 381 |
| 5 | (Malaysia) Universiti Malaya | Malaysia | 392 | 389 |
| 6 | (Indonesia) Diponegoro University | Indonesia | 382 | 403 |
| 7 | (Indonesia) State University of Padang | Indonesia | 419 | 422 |
| 8 | Universiti Kebangsaan Malaysia | Malaysia | 440 | 438 |
| 9 | (Indonesia) Padjadjaran University | Indonesia | 469 | 468 |
| 10 | (Indonesia) State University of Malang | Indonesia | 473 | 474 |
| 11 | (Indonesia) Sebelas Maret University | Indonesia | 478 | 478 |
| 12 | (Indonesia) Gadjah Mada University | Indonesia | 489 | 486 |
| 13 | (Indonesia) State University of Semarang | Indonesia | 494 | 499 |
| 14 | (Indonesia) Yogyakarta State University | Indonesia | 503 | 508 |
| 15 | (Indonesia) Sunan Kalijaga State Islamic University | Indonesia | 538 | 548 |
| 16 | Universiti Sains Malaysia | Malaysia | 565 | 554 |
| 17 | Universiti Putra Malaysia | Malaysia | 567 | 558 |
| 18 | Universiti Teknologi Malaysia | Malaysia | 582 | 575 |
| 19 | (Indonesia) State University of Surabaya | Indonesia | 597 | 606 |
| 20 | (Malaysia) Universiti Teknologi MARA | Malaysia | 625 | 620 |

=== Edurank : Mathematics ===
| Top 20 | University | Country | 2025 | 2026 |
|---|---|---|---|---|
| 1 | National University of Singapore | Singapore | 43 | 44 |
| 2 | (Singapore) Nanyang Technological University | Singapore | 69 | 68 |
| 3 | (Malaysia) Universiti Malaya | Malaysia | 349 | 345 |
| 4 | Universiti Teknologi Malaysia | Malaysia | 361 | 368 |
| 5 | Universiti Kebangsaan Malaysia | Malaysia | 387 | 379 |
| 6 | Universiti Putra Malaysia | Malaysia | 392 | 385 |
| 7 | Universiti Sains Malaysia | Malaysia | 399 | 391 |
| 8 | Indonesia University of Education | Indonesia | 439 | 463 |
| 9 | (Indonesia) State University of Malang | Indonesia | 497 | 496 |
| 10 | (Thailand) Mahidol University | Thailand | 545 | 541 |
| 11 | (Indonesia) State University of Padang | Indonesia | 553 | 554 |
| 12 | (Malaysia) Universiti Teknologi MARA | Malaysia | 561 | 555 |
| 13 | (Indonesia) Yogyakarta State University | Indonesia | 580 | 579 |
| 14 | (Indonesia) Sebelas Maret University | Indonesia | 612 | 603 |
| 15 | (Indonesia) State University of Semarang | Indonesia | 623 | 624 |
| 16 | Universitas Indonesia | Indonesia | 662 | 650 |
| 17 | (Thailand) Chulalongkorn University | Thailand | 661 | 651 |
| 18 | (Indonesia) State University of Surabaya | Indonesia | 705 | 701 |
| 19 | Singapore Management University | Singapore | 711 | 713 |
| 20 | (Thailand) Chiang Mai University | Thailand | 834 | 824 |

=== Edurank : Medicine ===
| Top 20 | University | Country | 2025 | 2026 |
|---|---|---|---|---|
| 1 | National University of Singapore | Singapore | 131 | 130 |
| 2 | (Thailand) Mahidol University | Thailand | 238 | 234 |
| 3 | (Singapore) Nanyang Technological University | Singapore | 356 | 353 |
| 4 | (Malaysia) Universiti Malaya | Malaysia | 386 | 383 |
| 5 | (Thailand) Chulalongkorn University | Thailand | 420 | 412 |
| 6 | Universitas Indonesia | Indonesia | 421 | 423 |
| 7 | Universiti Putra Malaysia | Malaysia | 543 | 541 |
| 8 | Universiti Sains Malaysia | Malaysia | 544 | 544 |
| 10 | (Thailand) Chiang Mai University | Thailand | 614 | 604 |
| 11 | Universiti Kebangsaan Malaysia | Malaysia | 623 | 610 |
| 12 | (Indonesia) Airlangga University | Indonesia | 655 | 653 |
| 13 | (Thailand) Khon Kaen University | Thailand | 711 | 708 |
| 14 | (Indonesia) Gadjah Mada University | Indonesia | 728 | 723 |
| 15 | (Indonesia) Padjadjaran University | Indonesia | 800 | 791 |
| 16 | (Thailand) Prince of Songkla University | Thailand | 845 | 841 |
| 17 | (Indonesia) Udayana University | Indonesia | 866 | 886 |
| 18 | (Indonesia) Diponegoro University | Indonesia | 895 | 910 |
| 19 | (Malaysia) Universiti Teknologi MARA | Malaysia | 927 | 924 |
| 20 | Universiti Teknologi Malaysia | Malaysia | 992 | 986 |

=== Edurank : Physics ===
| Top 20 | University | Country | 2025 | 2026 |
|---|---|---|---|---|
| 1 | National University of Singapore | Singapore | 30 | 29 |
| 2 | (Singapore) Nanyang Technological University | Singapore | 45 | 45 |
| 3 | (Malaysia) Universiti Malaya | Malaysia | 333 | 328 |
| 4 | Universiti Teknologi Malaysia | Malaysia | 368 | 363 |
| 5 | Universiti Sains Malaysia | Malaysia | 400 | 394 |
| 6 | Universiti Putra Malaysia | Malaysia | 452 | 445 |
| 7 | Universiti Kebangsaan Malaysia | Malaysia | 489 | 479 |
| 8 | (Thailand) Chulalongkorn University | Thailand | 574 | 570 |
| 9 | (Malaysia) Universiti Teknologi MARA | Malaysia | 756 | 753 |
| 10 | (Thailand) Mahidol University | Thailand | 837 | 824 |
| 11 | (Indonesia) Bandung Institute of Technology | Indonesia | 894 | 879 |
| 12 | Universitas Indonesia | Indonesia | 936 | 927 |
| 13 | (Malaysia) Universiti Teknologi Petronas | Malaysia | 961 | 939 |
| 14 | (Thailand) Chiang Mai University | Thailand | 987 | 979 |
| 15 | (Thailand) King Mongkut's University of Technology Thonburi | Thailand | 1003 | 1012 |
| 16 | University of Malaysia, Pahang | Malaysia | 1034 | 1023 |
| 17 | (Thailand) Prince of Songkla University | Thailand | 1040 | 1028 |
| 18 | University of Malaysia Perlis | Malaysia | 1051 | 1052 |
| 19 | (Indonesia) Gadjah Mada University | Indonesia | 1098 | 1081 |
| 20 | (Thailand) Kasetsart University | Thailand | 1186 | 1180 |

=== Edurank : Psychology ===
| Top 20 | University | Country | 2025 | 2026 |
|---|---|---|---|---|
| 1 | National University of Singapore | Singapore | 107 | 106 |
| 2 | (Singapore) Nanyang Technological University | Singapore | 161 | 162 |
| 3 | (Malaysia) Universiti Malaya | Malaysia | 394 | 391 |
| 4 | (Thailand) Mahidol University | Thailand | 416 | 406 |
| 5 | Universitas Indonesia | Indonesia | 429 | 430 |
| 6 | Universiti Kebangsaan Malaysia | Malaysia | 484 | 474 |
| 7 | Universiti Sains Malaysia | Malaysia | 528 | 513 |
| 8 | Universiti Putra Malaysia | Malaysia | 568 | 566 |
| 9 | (Malaysia) Universiti Teknologi MARA | Malaysia | 596 | 590 |
| 10 | (Thailand) Chulalongkorn University | Thailand | 609 | 603 |
| 11 | Universiti Teknologi Malaysia | Malaysia | 636 | 633 |
| 12 | Indonesia University of Education | Indonesia | 643 | 644 |
| 13 | (Indonesia) State University of Malang | Indonesia | 705 | 704 |
| 14 | (Indonesia) State University of Padang | Indonesia | 716 | 722 |
| 15 | (Indonesia) Airlangga University | Indonesia | 799 | 786 |
| 16 | (Indonesia) Yogyakarta State University | Indonesia | 813 | 815 |
| 17 | (Thailand) Chiang Mai University | Thailand | 818 | 806 |
| 18 | (Indonesia) Gadjah Mada University | Indonesia | 834 | 826 |
| 19 | (Indonesia) Sebelas Maret University | Indonesia | 830 | 836 |
| 20 | (Indonesia) State University of Semarang | Indonesia | 935 | 939 |

== See Also ==
- Rankings of universities in Indonesia
