= Rankings of universities in Indonesia =

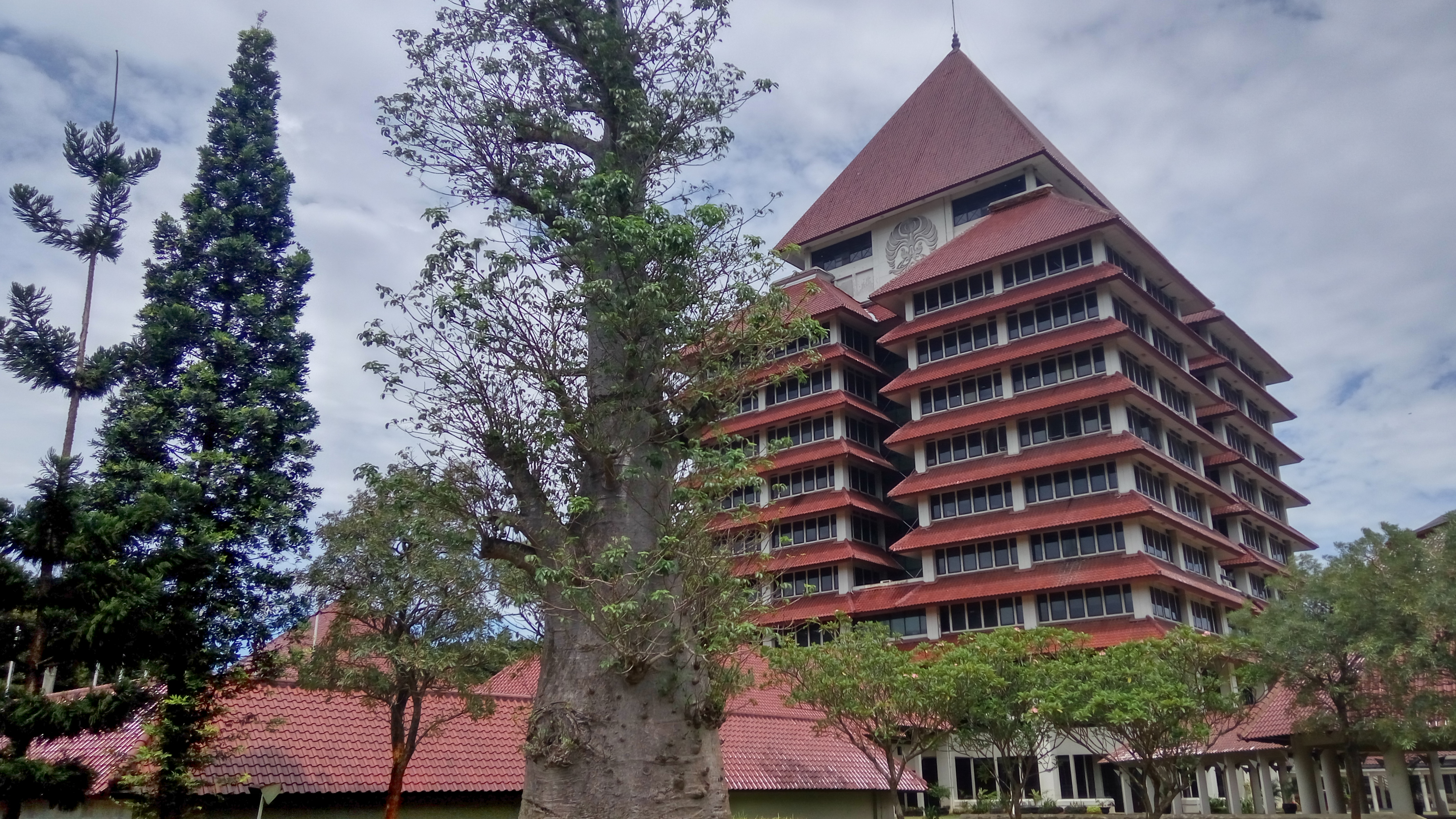
Universitas Indonesia considered among one of best Universities in Indonesia

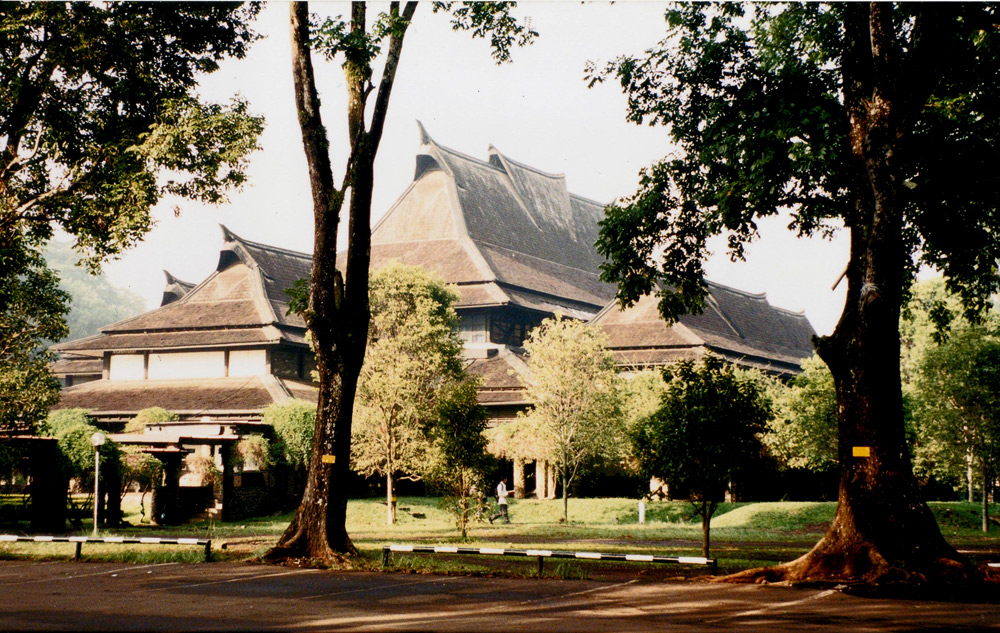
Aula Barat ITB.

Rankings of universities in Indonesia are typically published annually by a variety of nationally, and internationally based publications. Rankings of post-secondary institutions have most often been conducted by magazines, newspapers, websites, governments, or academia. Ranking are established to help inform potential applicants about universities in Indonesia based on a range of criteria, including student body characteristics, classes, faculty, finances, library, and reputation. Various rankings consider combinations of factors, including funding and endowment, research excellence and/or influence, specialization expertise, admissions, student options, award numbers, internationalization, graduate employment, industrial linkage, historical reputation and other criteria. Various rankings also evaluate universities based on research output.

Several universities in Indonesia have also placed in rankings which includes other universities from around the world; such as QS World University Rankings, the Times Higher Education World University Rankings, CWTS Leiden Ranking and the University Ranking by Academic Performance.

== Admissions ==
Student admissions are done exclusively through a national selection. At the national level, based on the competitiveness of entering SNMPTN/SBMPTN or SNBT in the Science (IPA) and Social (IPS) streams from year to year, the universities with the highest level of difficulty can be seen from the average scores of the state university entrance exams, as shown in the following table.

=== Sciences ===
National Test-Based Selection (SNBT) Saintek-Score
National Rank	University	Average Score													
National Rank	University	2024	2023	2022	2021	2020	2019	2018	2017	2016	2015	2014	2013	2012	2011
1	Bandung Institute of Technology (ITB)	718.73	694.40	656.81	683.50	624.07	689.75	659.26	rank-1	700.10	706.52	rank-1	736.98	665.67	758.34
2	University of Indonesia	704.83	684.29	665.86	693.52	620.01	679.96	638.26	rank-2	667.44	673.75	rank-2	708.12	688.38	735.94
3	Gadjah Mada University	702.48	681.61	645.94	656.52	611.45	659.06	632.79	rank-3	648.46	650.68	rank-4	671.79	643.24	677.63
4	Sepuluh Nopember Institute of Technology (ITS)	673.47	656.70	633.20	630.16	606.77	653.13	623.50	rank-4	647.54	652.00	rank-3	650.11	-	675.53
5	Airlangga University	655.96	648.92	631.79	639.97	588.48	632.05	610.89	rank-5	616.67	621.15	-	632.74	629.09	660.82
6	Diponegoro University	653.26	639.45	622.71	631.86	592.55	633.25	608.69	rank-7	620.33	624.63	-	-	607.05	635.29
7	IPB University	648.15	630.02	610.01	621.86	586.18	627.98	610.09	rank-8	613.68	616.13	rank-5	641.00	-	653.89
8	Padjadjaran University	645.28	632.21	619.94	630.19	589.08	634.06	605.98	rank-6	618.24	622.71	-	640.04	631.77	655.18
9	UPN Veteran Jakarta (UPN VJ)	627.85	622.52	618.51	621.97	585.77	621.61	599.99	rank-10	608.68	-	Did not participate before 2015			
10	Sebelas Maret University (UNS)	626.25	624.75	621.02	628.64	587.39	626.90	606.92	rank-9	611.00	621.07	-	-	599.28	630.82

=== Socials ===
National Test-Based Selection (SNBT) Soshum-Score
National Rank	University	Average Score										
National Rank	University	2024	2023	2022	2021	2020	2019	2018	2017	2016	2015	2014
1	University of Indonesia	-	-	690.92	694.60	608.63	662.83	643.47	rank-1	669.52	-	rank-2
2	Bandung Institute of Technology (ITB)	-	-	682.30	683.67	628.59	662.64	648.33	rank-3	651.97	-	rank-1
3	Gadjah Mada University	-	-	680.49	686.98	608.04	659.91	648.08	rank-2	652.92	-	rank-3
4	Diponegoro University	-	-	651.32	653.79	583.80	627.51	619.87	rank-6	617.99	-	-
5	Padjadjaran University	-	-	649.07	653.48	582.63	626.38	613.60	rank-4	621.78	-	-
6	Sepuluh Nopember Institute of Technology (ITS)	-	-	648.76	649.89	586.63	632.98	623.60	-	-	-	-
7	Airlangga University	-	-	645.83	643.48	581.39	621.95	620.13	rank-5	616.66	-	rank-4
8	Brawijaya University	-	-	635.26	635.67	572.96	613.36	613.42	rank-7	606.14	-	rank-5
9	UPN Veteran Jakarta (UPN VJ)	-	-	623.26	630.04	569.12	605.88	-	-	608.68	-	-
10	Jenderal Soedirman University	-	-	621.98	628.74	-	-	-	-	-	-	-

== Document ==
=== SINTA ===
SINTA (Science and Technology Index) is a comprehensive online portal and indexing platform for scientific publications in Indonesia. It managed by the Indonesian Ministry of Higher Education, Science, and Technology (Kemendiktisaintek).

- Function: Tracks, indexes, and evaluates the performance of researchers, institutions, and journals. Acts as a primary directory for national accredited journals.
- Integrations: SINTA provides benchmarks and links to international databases by integrating profiles from Google Scholar and Scopus.
- Accessibility: Rankings and publication data directly on the official Science and Technology Index website

Science and Technology Index (SINTA)
National Rank	University	Score			
National Rank	University	SINTA Score 3 Yr	SINTA Score Overall	Productivity 3 Yr	Productivity Overall
1	Gadjah Mada University	1,678,814	5,171,733	615	1,894
2	IPB University	1,415,701	3,525,058	1,038	2,584
3	Airlangga University	1,359,962	2,994,865	816	1,797
4	University of Indonesia	1,201,343	3,462,030	604	1,741
5	Diponegoro University	1,016,085	2,536,404	571	1,427
6	Sepuluh Nopember Institute of Technology (ITS)	1,013,116	2,389,443	886	2,089
7	Brawijaya University	882,264	2,286,269	415	1,076
8	Bandung Institute of Technology (ITB)	826.512	2,885,149	592	2,068
9	Brawijaya University	780,909	1,825,338	444	1,037
10	Padjadjaran University	749,692	2,208,372	635	1,870
11	Andalas University	733,654	1,857,489	480	1,215
12	Tarumanegara University	730,563	1,112,235	2,002	3,047
13	Indonesia University of Education (UPI)	722,987	1,648,467	452	1,031
14	Muhammadiyah University of Surakarta (UMS)	687,683	1,485,883	867	1,874
15	Telkom University (TEL-U)	678,013	1,452,821	476	1,020
16	State University of Malang (UM)	674,049	1,467,297	601	1,309
17	State University of Padang (UNP)	668,192	1,544,754	445	1,029
18	Sebelas Maret University (UNS)	657,559	2,112,200	368	1,181
19	State University of Semarang (UNNES)	595,218	1,677,581	483	1,361
20	Pamulang University	562,573	1,076,788	233	446

=== Scopus ===
Scopus is a scientific abstract and citation database, launched by the academic publisher Elsevier in 2004. Journals in Scopus are reviewed for sufficient quality each year according to four numerical measures: h-Index, CiteScore, SJR (SCImago Journal Rank) and SNIP (source normalized impact per paper).

The journals listed in Scopus are considered to meet the requirement for peer review quality established by several research grant agencies for their grant recipients and by degree-accreditation boards in a number of countries.

SCOPUS
National Rank	University	Score								
National Rank	University	Document	Citation	Cited Document	Citation per Researchers	Q1	Q2	Q3	Q4	No-Q
1	University of Indonesia	40,449	436,702	30,059	175.38	7,778	6,366	8,580	10,128	7,597
2	Gadjah Mada University	33,384	335,274	25,691	107.70	7,314	5,701	7,621	7,630	5,618
3	Bandung Institute of Technology (ITB)	31,303	343,139	23,920	245.27	6,964	4,055	4,944	6,205	9,135
4	Airlangga University	23,635	231,976	16,478	121.39	4,458	4,156	5,253	5,912	3,874
5	IPB University	20,634	200,031	15,713	144.85	3,375	3,150	5,125	5,770	3,214
6	Sepuluh Nopember Institute of Technology (ITS)	20,599	164,494	15,186	135.95	3,183	2,774	3,544	5,563	5,535
7	Sebelas Maret University (UNS)	19,047	159,482	13,393	76.27	2,828	2,629	4,278	6,835	2,477
8	Brawijaya University	19,016	140,445	13,724	60.83	3,010	3,285	4,651	5,144	2,926
9	Diponegoro University	19,006	134,787	13,582	72.86	2,463	2,496	4,814	6,059	3,174
10	Padjadjaran University	18,514	193,337	13,894	138.69	4,720	3,771	4,167	3,562	2,294
11	Hasanuddin University	17,061	143,970	11,499	61.74	2,561	2,173	4,100	5,943	2,284
12	Bina Nusantara University (BINUS)	15,741	84,552	9,838	44.64	1,475	1,703	2,644	3,668	6,251
13	University of North Sumatra (USU)	13,924	84,380	9,565	49.03	1,533	1,725	3,567	5,177	1,922
14	Telkom University (TEL-U)	12,931	80,191	9,165	51.60	1,245	1,312	1,626	1,959	6,789
15	State University of Malang (UM)	10,428	58,337	6,938	51.86	1,405	1,577	1,617	3,944	1,885
16	Indonesia University of Education (UPI)	10,182	67,286	7,089	41.24	1,332	1,239	1,850	4,177	1,584
17	Andalas University	9,242	63,826	6,504	37.34	1,278	1,442	2,711	2,454	1,357
18	Yogyakarta State University (UNY)	7,547	44,225	5,210	30.56	1,095	1,212	1,191	3,202	847
19	State University of Semarang (UNNES)	7,325	115,948	5,171	90.44	1,016	991	1,390	2,761	1,167
20	State University of Padang (UNP)	6,653	39,426	4,647	25.22	1,075	1,428	1,316	2,200	634

== World University Rankings ==
=== Opinion-based ===
Several international publications assess the quality of a university by using the weighted average of opinions gathered in surveys, alongside other quantitative measures. Those surveyed typically include members of academia and the business community. These types of rankings include Quacquarelli Symonds's World University Ranking, and Times Higher Education World University Ranking

The following table includes Indonesia universities, and their most recent global rank in the aforementioned publications with national rank:

==== QS WUR ====
QS World University
Change since 2026	National Rank	University	World Rank												
Change since 2026	National Rank	University	2027	2026	2025	2024	2023	2022	2021	2020	2019	2018	2017	2016	2015
Steady	1	University of Indonesia	191	189	206	237	248	290	305	296	292	277	325	358	310
Steady	2	Gadjah Mada University	206	224	239	263	231	254	254	320	391	401-410	501-550	551-600	551-600
▲ (1)	3	Airlangga University	276	287	308	345	369	465	521-530	651-700	751-800	701-750	701+	701+	701+
▼ (1)	4	Bandung Institute of Technology (ITB)	287	255	256	281	235	303	313	331	359	331	401-410	431-440	461-470
Steady	5	IPB University	419	399	426	489	449	511-520	531-540	601-650	701-750	751-800	701+	701+	701+
▲ (1)	6	Padjadjaran University	496	515	596	661-700	751-800	801-1000	801-1000	751-800	651-700	-	-	-	-
▼ (1)	7	Sepuluh Nopember Institute of Technology (ITS)	497	509	585	621-630	701-750	751-800	751-800	801-1000	801-1000	801-1000	701+	701+	701+
▲ (1)	8	Brawijaya University	616	680	801-850	801-850	801-1000	1001-1200	1001+	1001+	801-1000	801-1000	701+	701+	701+
▼ (1)	9	Diponegoro University	662	624	721-730	791-800	801-1000	1001-1200	1001+	801-1000	801-1000	801-1000	701+	701+	701+
▲ (1)	10	Hasanuddin University	851-900	951-1000	1001-1200	1001-1200	1001-1200	1001-1200	-	-	-	-	-	-	-
▼ (1)	11	Bina Nusantara University (BINUS)	901-950	851-900	951-1000	1001-1200	1001-1200	1001-1200	801-1000	801-1000	-	-	-	-	-
▲ (1)	12	Sebelas Maret University (UNS)	951-1000	1001-1200	1001-1200	1001-1200	1001-1200	1201+	-	-	-	-	-	-	-
▼ (1)	13	University of North Sumatra (USU)	1001-1200	1001-1200	1201-1400	1201-1400	1201+	-	-	-	-	-	-	-	-
▼ (2)	14	Telkom University	1201-1400	1001-1200	1001-1200	1001-1200	1001-1200	1001-1200	-	-	-	-	-	-	-
▲ (1)	14	Muhammadiyah University of Yogyakarta (UMY)	1201-1400	1201-1400	1201-1400	1201-1400	-	-	-	-	-	-	-	-	-
▲ (4)	16	Andalas University (UNAND)	1401+	1401+	1401+	1201-1400	1201+	-	-	-	-	-	-	-	
▲ (4)	16	State University of Padang (UNP)	1401+	1401+	-	-	-	-	-	-	-	-	-	-	-
▼ (1)	16	Yogyakarta State University (UNY)	1401+	1201-1400	1201-1400	1201-1400	-	-	-	-	-	-	-	-	-
▼ (1)	16	Indonesia University of Education (UPI)	1401+	1201-1400	1201-1400	1201-1400	-	-	-	-	-	-	-	-	-
▼ (1)	16	Trisakti University	1401+	1201-1400	-	-	-	-	-	-	-	-	-	-	-
—N/a		ITENAS Bandung	—N/a	1201-1400	-	-	-	-	-	-	-	-	-	-	-
—N/a		Atma Jaya University	—N/a	1401+	1201-1400	1201-1400	-	-	-	-	-	-	-	-	-
—N/a		State University of Malang (UNM)	—N/a	1401+	1401+	1401+	-	-	-	-	-	-	-	-	-
—N/a		Syiah Kuala University (UNSYIAH)	—N/a	1401+	-	-	-	-	-	-	-	-	-	-	-
—N/a		Islamic University of Indonesia (UII)	—N/a	1401+	1201-1400	1201-1400	-	-	-	-	-	-	-	-	-
—N/a		Petra Christian University	—N/a	1401+	1401+	1401+	-	-	-	-	-	-	-	-	-

==== THE WUR ====
THE World University
National Rank	University	World Rank										
National Rank	University	2026	2025	2024	2023	2022	2021	2020	2019	2018	2017	2016
1	University of Indonesia	801-1000	801-1000	801-1000	1001-1200	801-1000	801-1000	601-800	601-800	801-1000	801+	601-800
2	Sebelas Maret University (UNS)	1001-1200	1201-1500	1201-1500	1201-1500	1200+	-	-	-	-	-	-
3	Bina Nusantara University (BINUS)	1201-1500	1201-1500	1201-1500	1201-1500	1201+	-	-	-	-	-	-
4	Bandung Institute of Technology (ITB)	1201-1500	1201-1500	1201-1500	1201-1500	1001-1200	1001+	1001+	801-1000	801-1000	801+	-
5	Airlangga University	1201-1500	1201-1500	1201-1500	1201-1500	1201+	-	-	-	-	-	-
6	Gadjah Mada University	1201-1500	1201-1500	1201-1500	1201-1500	1201+	1001+	1001+	1001+	801-1000	-	-
7	Muhammadiyah University of Surakarta (UMS)	1201-1500	1201-1500	-	-	-	-	-	-	-	-	-
8	Padjadjaran University	1201-1500	1501+	1501+	1501+	1201+	1001+	-	-	-	-	-
9	Atma Jaya University	1501+	-	-	-	-	-	-	-	-	-	-
10	Diponegoro University	1501+	1501+	1501+	1501+	1201+	-	-	-	-	-	-
11	Haluoleo University	1501+	-	-	-	-	-	-	-	-	-	-
12	Sepuluh Nopember Institute of Technology (ITS)	1501+	1501+	1200-1500	1200-1500	1201+	1001+	1001+	1001+	-	-	-
13	IPB University	1501+	1501+	1200-1500	1200-1500	1201+	1001+	1001+	1001+	1001+	-	-
14	Islamic University of Indonesia (UII)	1501+	1501+	1501+	1501+	-	-	-	-	-	-	-
15	Jember University	1501+	1501+	1501+	-	-	-	-	-	-	-	-
16	Sunan Gunung Djati University (UIN Bandung)	1501+	-	-	-	-	-	-	-	-	-	-
17	State University of Malang (UNM)	1501+	1501+	1501+	1200-1500	-	-	-	-	-	-	-
18	Telkom University	1501+	1501+	1501+	1501+	1201+	1001+	-	-	-	-	-
19	Ahmad Dahlan University	1501+	1501+	-	-	-	-	-	-	-	-	-
20	Andalas University	1501+	1501+	1501+	1501+	-	-	-	-	-	-	-
21	Muhammadiyah University of Malang (UMM)	1501+	1501+	-	-	-	-	-	-	-	-	-
22	Muhammadiyah University of Yogyakarta (UMY)	1501+	1501+	-	-	-	-	-	-	-	-	-
23	State University of Jakarta (UNJ)	1501+	-	-	-	-	-	-	-	-	-	-
24	State University of Padang (UNP)	1501+	1501+	-	-	-	-	-	-	-	-	-
25	State University of Semarang (UNNES)	1501+	1501+	-	-	-	-	-	-	-	-	-
26	State University of Surabaya (UNESA)	1501+	1501+	1501+	-	-	-	-	-	-	-	-
27	Yogyakarta State University (UNY)	1501+	1501+	1501+	-	-	-	-	-	-	-	-
28	Indonesia University of Education (UPI)	1501+	1501+	1501+	1201-1500	1001-1200	-	-	-	-	-	-
29	Sriwijaya University	1501+	1501+	1501+	-	-	-	-	-	-	-	-
30	University of North Sumatra (USU)	1501+	1501+	1501+	1501+	-	-	-	-	-	-	-
31	Syiah Kuala University (UNSYIAH)	1501+	1501+	1200-1500	-	-	-	-	-	-	-	-
32	Brawijaya University	1501+	1501+	1501+	1201+	1001+	1001+	-	-	-	-	-
33	Lampung University	1501+	1501+	1501+	-	-	-	-	-	-	-	-
34	Mataram University	1501+	1501+	-	-	-	-	-	-	-	-	-

=== Quantitative-based ===
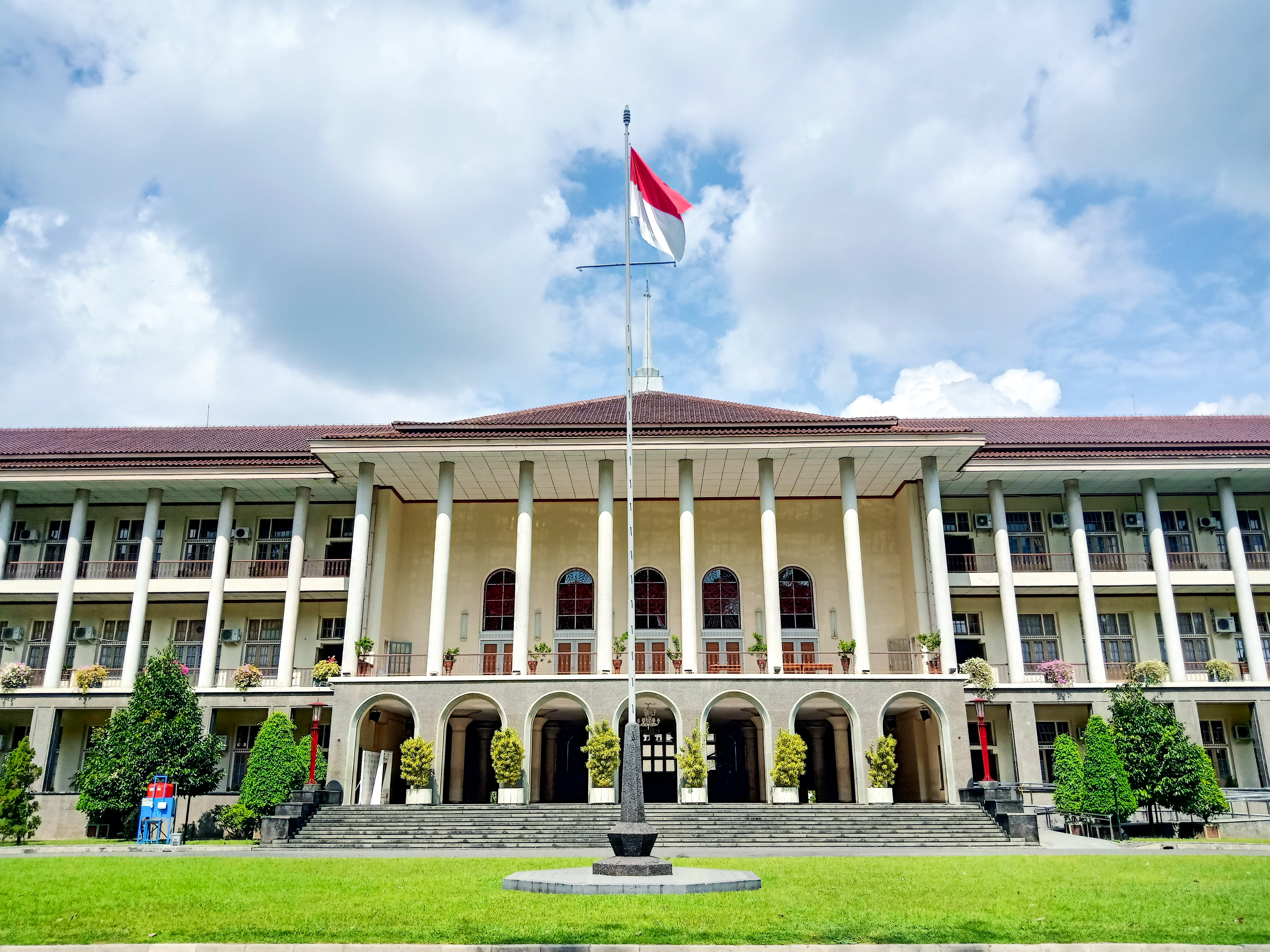
Gedung Pusat (Rektorat) UGM

Several institutions and publications have created university rankings whose methodologies rely only on quantitative measures. These rankings use quantitative measures to assess the quality of an institution, such as bibliometrics, or through the number of awards and distinctions accrued by a university's faculty and/or alumni. Quantitative international rankings include the Center for World University Rankings.

Several institutions publish rankings that are primarily bibliometric, based on citation analysis. Biblometric rankings specifically evaluate the impact a university has on specialized journals and other academic publications. Bibliometrics is a field of statistics used to provide quantitative analysis of academic literature. Primarily bibliometric rankings include those; CWTS Leiden Ranking. based exclusively on bibliometric indicators by Leiden University in the Netherlands. The Clarivate Analytics bibliographic database Web of Science is used as the source of the publication and citation data. And the University Ranking by Academic Performance, published by the Middle East Technical University.

The following table includes Indonesia universities, and their most recent global rank in the aforementioned publications (with national ranks in parentheses):

==== CWTS Open Edition ====
CWTS Leiden Ranking Open Edition
National Rank	University	World Rank						
National Rank	University	2020-23	2019-22	2018-21	2017-20	2016-19	2015-18	2014-17
1	University of Indonesia	307	286	250	271	375	486	767
2	Gadjah Mada University	513	521	530	590	677	781	980
3	Airlangga University	640	718	827	967	1283	1685	2060
4	Bandung Institute of Technology (ITB)	728	683	665	668	659	689	755
5	Padjadjaran University	790	878	967	1102	1237	1419	1799
6	Diponegoro University	868	798	677	728	853	1012	1652
7	Sebelas Maret University (UNS)	887	852	811	809	898	1180	1556
8	Brawijaya University	975	1011	1017	1056	1210	1343	1552
9	Sepuluh Nopember Institute of Technology (ITS)	1010	926	866	864	908	1091	1316
10	State University of Malang (UNM)	1070	1153	1131	1373	1814	2084	2362
11	Hasanuddin University	1134	1136	1203	1333	1434	1838	2133
12	University of North Sumatra (USU)	1141	1053	924	982	1148	1447	2221
13	IPB University	1152	1216	1283	1369	1341	1318	1373
14	Bina Nusantara University (BINUS)	1248	1783	1768	1880	1973	2080	2130
15	Indonesia University of Education (UPI)	1274	1048	1072	1087	1166	1791	2062
16	Syiah Kuala University (UNSYIAH)	1370	1460	1505	1691	2046	2104	2388
17	Yogyakarta State University (UNY)	1624	1433	1333	1349	1643	2276	2578
18	Muhammadiyah University of Yogyakarta (UMY)	1696	2251	2409	2652	2692	2697	2718
19	Sriwijaya University	1763	1489	1441	1455	1675	2187	2387
20	State University of Padang (UNP)	1769	1660	1657	1906	2226	2635	2707
21	Udayana University (UNUD)	1816	1801	1853	1882	2012	1288	2316
22	State University of Semarang (UNNES)	1826	1624	1432	1551	1837	2114	2475
23	Andalas University (UNAND)	1852	1840	1775	1760	1897	2044	2222
24	Jember University	1886	1887	1857	1946	2217	2346	2500
25	State University of Jakarta (UNJ)	2022	1806	1803	2128	2200	2574	2639

==== URAP ====
University Ranking by Academic Performance
National Rank	University	World Rank						
National Rank	University	2024-25	2023-24	2022-23	2021-22	2020-21	2019-20	2018-19
1	University of Indonesia	945	969	1017	1111	1161	1408	1441
2	Airlangga University	1113	1201	1614	2011	2324	-	-
3	Gadjah Mada University	1231	1310	1339	1462	1557	1594	1701
4	Bandung Institute of Technology (ITB)	1291	1417	1411	1440	1607	1595	1613
5	Padjadjaran University	1576	1827	2071	2339	2437	2463	-
6	IPB University	1817	1925	1833	1844	1824	1893	1899
7	Hasanuddin University	1985	2168	2082	2369	2413	-	-
8	Sepuluh Nopember Institute of Technology (ITS)	2011	2222	2210	2408	2588	-	2438
9	Diponegoro University	2144	2398	2305	2524	2689	-	2455
10	Sebelas Maret University (UNS)	2172	2010	2381	2567	2872	-	-
11	Brawijaya University	2266	2432	2505	2561	2646	-	-
12	Syiah Kuala University (UNSYIAH)	2297	2408	2346	2600	2789	-	-
13	University of North Sumatra (USU)	2684	2898	2857	-	-	-	-
14	Bina Nusantara University (BINUS)	2754	2808	2867	-	-	-	-
15	Udayana University (UNUD)	2845	2941	2941	-	2957	-	-
16	Andalas University (UNAND)	2929	-	-	-	-	-	-
17	State University of Malang (UNM)	2990	-	-	-	-	-	-

==== CWUR ====
Center for World University Rankings
National Rank	University	World Rank							
National Rank	University	2026	2025	2024	2023	2022	2021	2020	2019
1	University of Indonesia	1324	1376	1425	1502	1553	1618	1639	1600
2	Gadjah Mada University	1741	1806	1863	1965	1970	1995	-	-
3	Bandung Institute of Technology (ITB)	1879	1900	1887	1894	1953	-	-	-

== See also ==
- List of universities in Indonesia
- Rankings of universities in ASEAN
