= SNBT =

Entrance exam in Indonesia for the admission of students in state universities

Seleksi Nasional Berdasarkan Tes
- Acronym: SNBT
- Type: Computer-based standardized test
- Administrator: Educational Testing Management Center (BPPP), Ministry of Education, Culture, Research, and Technology
- Skills tested: Logical reasoning, Reading comprehension, Common knowledge, Basic mathematics, Applied mathematics, Literacy test
- Purpose: Undergraduate admissions to state universities
- Year started: 2008 (as SNMPTN Tulis); 2013 (as SBMPTN); 2023 (as SNBT)
- Duration: 195 minutes (2024)
- Offered: Once a year
- Regions: Indonesia
- Languages: Indonesian
- Annual number of test takers: 803,852 (2023)
- Prerequisites: High school students or similar degree
- Fee: Rp200.000,00 (2023)
- Website: SNPMB

Seleksi Nasional Berdasarkan Tes or SNBT (Test-Based National Selection), is an Indonesian college entrance system for admission of new students in state universities using written examinations nationally, which has various advantages, both for college applicants, public universities, as well as national interests. For college applicants, written exams are very profitable because they are more efficient, cheaper, and flexible due to cross-regional mechanisms.

SNBT is managed by Balai Pengelolaan Pengujian Pendidikan or BPPP (Educational Testing Management Center), an agency under the Ministry of Education, Culture, Research, and Technology.

== History ==
Based on its history, the beginning of SBMPTN implementation starts from the implementation of Seleksi Nasional Masuk Perguruan Tinggi Negeri (SNMPTN, Joint National Selection of State Universities) through written test (SNMPTN Tulis) held in 2008. At that time, SNMPTN is organized by Dirjen Dikti Kemendikbud (Directorate General of Higher Education of Ministry of Education and Culture). However, starting in 2013 the tests is submitted to the Majelis Rektor Perguruan Tinggi Negeri Indonesia (MRPTNI, Rectors Assembly of State Universities of Indonesia). Based on the very long experience in executing the selection of new admissions through written examination, in 2013, MRPTNI held a written test as one form of admission to PTN in addition to SNMPTN. This test put forward the principle of trust and togetherness is called Seleksi Bersama Masuk Perguruan Tinggi Negeri (SBMPTN).

Written exams use test questions developed in such way that meet the requirements for validity, difficulty level, and sufficient distinguishing features. The written exam of SBMPTN is designed to measure the general capabilities that allegedly determine the success of prospective students in all courses, namely higher-order thinking, which includes academic potential, mastery of basic subject areas: the field of Saintek (Sains dan Teknologi, Science and Technology) or Soshum (Sosial dan Humaniora, Social and Humanities) fields. In addition to taking a written exam, participants who choose the course of Arts and/or Sports are required to take a skill exam.

== Participating universities ==
The number of state universities incorporated into SNBT (then SBMPTN) for the first time in 2013 is as much as 62 state universities and by 2015 it is estimated to increase to 77 state universities. This is caused by the number of new colleges and Islamic universities, which previously was in the Ministry of Religious Affairs then delegated to the Ministry of Research, Technology and Higher Education.

No	State University	Abbreviation	Province	2013	2014	2015*
1	Universitas Syiah Kuala	USK	Aceh	v	v	v
2	Universitas Malikussaleh	Unimal	Aceh	v	v	v
3	Universitas Islam Negeri Ar-Raniry	UIN Aceh	Aceh	x	x	v
4	Universitas Teuku Umar	UTU	Aceh	x	x	**
5	Universitas Samudra	Unsam	Aceh	x	x	**
6	Universitas Sumatera Utara	USU	Sumatera Utara	v	v	v
7	Universitas Negeri Medan	Unimed	Sumatera Utara	v	v	v
8	Universitas Riau	Unri	Riau	v	v	v
9	Universitas Islam Negeri Sultan Syarif Kasim Riau	UIN Riau	Riau	v	v	v
10	Universitas Andalas	Unand	Sumatera Barat	v	v	v
11	Universitas Negeri Padang	UNP	Sumatera Barat	v	v	v
12	Universitas Jambi	Unja	Jambi	v	v	v
13	Universitas Maritim Raja Ali Haji	UMRAH	Kepulauan Riau	v	v	v
14	Universitas Bengkulu	Unib	Bengkulu	v	v	v
15	Universitas Sriwijaya	Unsri	Sumatera Selatan	v	v	v
16	Universitas Islam Negeri Raden Fatah	UIN Palembang	Sumatera Selatan	x	v	v
17	Universitas Lampung	Unila	Lampung	v	v	v
18	Institut Teknologi Sumatera	Itera	Lampung	x	x	v
19	Universitas Bangka Belitung	UBB	Kepulauan Bangka Belitung	v	v	v
20	Universitas Indonesia	UI	DKI Jakarta	v	v	v
21	Universitas Negeri Jakarta	UNJ	DKI Jakarta	v	v	v
22	Universitas Islam Negeri Syarif Hidayatullah Jakarta	UIN Jakarta	DKI Jakarta	v	v	v
23	Universitas Pembangunan Nasional "Veteran" Jakarta	UPN Veteran Jakarta	DKI Jakarta	x	x	**
24	Universitas Sultan Ageng Tirtayasa	Untirta	Banten	v	v	v
25	Institut Pertanian Bogor	IPB	Jawa Barat	v	v	v
26	Universitas Padjadjaran	Unpad	Jawa Barat	v	v	v
27	Universitas Pendidikan Indonesia	UPI	Jawa Barat	v	v	v
28	Institut Teknologi Bandung	ITB	Jawa Barat	v	v	v
29	Universitas Islam Negeri Sunan Gunung Djati	UIN SGD	Jawa Barat	v	v	v
30	Universitas Singaperbangsa Karawang	Unsika	Jawa Barat	x	x	**
31	Universitas Siliwangi	Unsil	Jawa Barat	x	x	**
32	Universitas Diponegoro	Undip	Jawa Tengah	v	v	v
33	Universitas Negeri Semarang	Unnes	Jawa Tengah	v	v	v
34	Universitas Islam Negeri Walisongo Semarang	UIN Semarang	Jawa Tengah	v	v	v
35	Universitas Jenderal Soedirman	Unsoed	Jawa Tengah	v	v	v
36	Universitas Sebelas Maret	UNS	Jawa Tengah	v	v	v
37	Universitas Tidar	Untidar	Jawa Tengah	x	x	**
38	Universitas Gadjah Mada	UGM	Daerah Istimewa Yogyakarta	v	v	v
39	Universitas Negeri Yogyakarta	UNY	Daerah Istimewa Yogyakarta	v	v	v
40	Universitas Islam Negeri Sunan Kalijaga Yogyakarta	UIN Suka	Daerah Istimewa Yogyakarta	v	v	v
41	Universitas Pembangunan Nasional "Veteran" Yogyakarta	UPN Veteran Yogyakarta	Daerah Istimewa Yogyakarta	x	x	**
42	Universitas Airlangga	Unair	Jawa Timur	v	v	v
43	Institut Teknologi Sepuluh Nopember	ITS	Jawa Timur	v	v	v
44	Universitas Negeri Surabaya	Unesa	Jawa Timur	v	v	v
45	Universitas Islam Negeri Sunan Ampel Surabaya	UIN Surabaya	Jawa Timur	v	v	v
46	Universitas Trunojoyo Madura	UTM	Jawa Timur	v	v	v
47	Universitas Brawijaya	UB	Jawa Timur	v	v	v
48	Universitas Negeri Malang	UM	Jawa Timur	v	v	v
49	Universitas Islam Negeri Maulana Malik Ibrahim Malang	UIN Malang	Jawa Timur	v	v	v
50	Universitas Jember	Unej	Jawa Timur	v	v	v
51	Universitas Pembangunan Nasional "Veteran" Jawa Timur	UPN Veteran Jatim	Jawa Timur	x	x	**
52	Universitas Udayana	Unud	Bali	v	v	v
53	Universitas Pendidikan Ganesha	Undiksha	Bali	v	v	v
54	Universitas Mataram	Unram	Nusa Tenggara Barat	v	v	v
55	Universitas Nusa Cendana	Undana	Nusa Tenggara Timur	v	v	v
56	Universitas Timor	Unimor	Nusa Tenggara Timur	x	x	**
57	Universitas Tanjungpura	Untan	Kalimantan Barat	v	v	v
58	Universitas Palangka Raya	UPR	Kalimantan Tengah	v	v	v
59	Universitas Lambung Mangkurat	ULM	Kalimantan Selatan	v	v	v
60	Universitas Mulawarman	Unmul	Kalimantan Timur	v	v	v
61	Institut Teknologi Kalimantan	ITK	Kalimantan Timur	x	x	v
62	Universitas Borneo Tarakan	UBT	Kalimantan Utara	v	v	v
63	Universitas Sam Ratulangi	Unsrat	Sulawesi Utara	v	v	v
64	Universitas Negeri Manado	Unima	Sulawesi Utara	v	v	v
65	Universitas Negeri Gorontalo	UNG	Gorontalo	v	v	v
66	Universitas Sulawesi Barat	Unsulbar	Sulawesi Barat	x	x	v
67	Universitas Tadulako	Untad	Sulawesi Tengah	v	v	v
68	Universitas Halu Oleo	Unho	Sulawesi Tenggara	v	v	v
69	Universitas 19 November Kolaka	USN	Sulawesi Tenggara	x	x	**
70	Universitas Hasanuddin	Unhas	Sulawesi Selatan	v	v	v
71	Universitas Negeri Makassar	UNM	Sulawesi Selatan	v	v	v
72	Universitas Islam Negeri Alauddin Makassar	UIN Makassar	Sulawesi Selatan	v	v	v
73	Universitas Khairun	Unkhair	Maluku Utara	v	v	v
74	Universitas Pattimura	Unpatti	Maluku	v	v	v
75	Universitas Negeri Papua	Unipa	Papua Barat	v	v	v
76	Universitas Cenderawasih	Uncen	Papua	v	v	v
77	Universitas Musamus Merauke	Unmus	Papua	v	v	v
Total of universities				63	64	78

== Exam ==
Examination in SNBT is called Ujian Tes Berbasis Komputer (UTBK) or "computer-based written test."

=== Type of exam ===
==== Written exam ====
- Tes Potensi Skolastik (Scholastic aptitude test) that consists of:
  - Kemampuan Penalaran Umum (Logical Reasoning Ability)
  - Pengetahuan dan Pemahaman Umum (General Comprehension and Knowledge)
  - Kemampuan Memahami Bacaan dan Menulis (Reading and Writing Comprehension Ability)
  - Pengetahuan Kuantitatif (Quantitative Knowledge)
- Tes Literasi (Literacy test) that consists of:
  - Literasi Bahasa Indonesia (Indonesian Literacy)
  - Literasi Bahasa Inggris (English Literacy)
  - Penalaran Matematika (Mathematical Reasoning)

==== Portfolio ====
Is a portfolio of ability/talent needed in order to apply for select study programs, submitted upon registration of SNBT which consists of eleven (11) categories:

- Sports
- Fine arts, design, and craft
- Dance
- Music
- Karawitan (Javanese music)
- Ethnomusicology
- Theatre
- Photography
- Film and television
- Pedalangan (traditional puppetry)
- Sendratasik (combined arts consisting of drama, dance, and music)
