= SMU =

SMU can refer to:

== Educational institutions ==
- St. Martin's University, Lacey, Washington, United States
- St. Matthew's University, the Cayman Islands
- St. Michaels University School, Victoria, British Columbia, Canada
- Saint Monica University, Cameroon
- Samuel Merritt University, Oakland, California, US
- Sangmyung University, Seoul and Cheonan, South Korea
- Sefako Makgatho Health Sciences University, Limpopo, South Africa
- Shanghai Maritime University, China
- Sikkim Manipal University, Gangtok, India
- Singapore Management University, Singapore
- Southern Medical University, Tonghe, Guangzhou, China
- Southern Methodist University, Dallas, Texas, US
  - SMU Mustangs, athletic teams
- Southeastern Massachusetts University, now University of Massachusetts Dartmouth, US
- Swansea Metropolitan University

== Other uses ==
- Finnish Seafarers' Union (Finnish: Suomen Merimies-Unioni)
- Scandinavian Monetary Union, defunct
- Somray language
- Source measure unit, a type of test equipment
- Special mission unit, a type of military unit
- Suburban Multiple Unit (Queensland Rail)
- Suriname Men United, a gay men's organization
- Svenska Missionskyrkans Ungdom Scout
- System Management Unit, in Apple computers
