= Indonesia University of Education =

Indonesian teacher education college

- Universitas Pendidikan Indonesia
- Former names: Teachers Education College (PTPG); Teachers and Education Science Institute (IKIP)
- Motto: Leading and Outstanding
- Type: State University
- Established: 20 October 1954 as PTPG (Teachers Education College)
- Affiliations: ASAIHL, AsTEN
- Rector: Prof. Dr. Didi Sukyadi, M.A.
- Students: 34.039 (2009)
- Location: Setiabudhi Street. 229th, Bandung, Indonesia; 6.8634°S 107.5943°E
- Campus: Urban 615,766 m^{2}
- Colors: Light Steel Blue, Red
- Nickname: Kampus Bumi Siliwangi
- Mascot: Villa Isola
- Website: www.upi.edu

Indonesia University of Education (Indonesian: Universitas Pendidikan Indonesia, UPI) is a public university in Bandung, West Java, Indonesia. It was established in 1954 as Teachers Education College (PTPG).

Indonesia University of Education is a multi-campus university, with one main campus and several others. The main campus of is at Dr. Setiabudhi Street 229th, Bandung, Indonesia; other campuses are in Cibiru, Tasikmalaya, Sumedang, Purwakarta, and Serang.

The development and improvement of UPI is not solely oriented towards the academic field, but also in various fields, including the consolidation of concepts and development plans. With the assistance of the Islamic Development Bank (IDB), UPI designed and managed the construction of a modern and representative campus building to support teaching and learning activities. The capabilities of the University of Education Indonesia, it is determined to make this educational institution.

== Faculties ==
=== Faculty of Education Science (FIP) ===
The Science of Education Faculty (SoEF/FIP) is led by Prof. Dr. Ahman, M.Pd (Dean). They have the following study programmes:

- Education Curriculum and Technology
- Educational Administration
- Psychology of Guidance and Counselling
- Nonformal Education
- Special Needs Education
- Psychology
- Library and Information
- Pedagogy: Elementary School Education and Preschool/Early Childhood Education

=== Social Science Education Faculty (FPIPS) ===
The Social Science Education Faculty is led by Siti Komariah, M.Si., Ph.D. (Dean). They have the following study programmes:

- Education of Civics
- Education of History
- Education of Geography
- Mapping Survey and Geographical Information
- Education of Social Science (not to be confused with the other programmes, this programme aims to produce teachers that are competent in teaching Social Science in middle school)
- Management of Resort and Leisure
- Management of Tourism Marketing
- Management of Catering Industry
- Basic Study Fields (MKDU) (runs the education of Religion and Belief, Pancasila, Entrepreneurship, Social, Cultural and Technological Environment Education, Sport, Art and Indonesian for all UPI's graduate students)
- Education Science of Islam Religion Education
- Science of Communication
- Education of Sociology

According to the Indonesian education system, Social Science is considered one of the subjects in middle schools (Sekolah Menengah Pertama). The teachers who teach Social Science in these middle schools are supposed to be from the Education of Social Science programme. In high schools, Social Science is divided into four different subjects: Geography, Sociology, History, and Economics. Each subject's teacher is supposed to be from the corresponding program of their respective subject, with the exception of Economics. A number of programmes, including the Education of Economics and the Education of Accounting, are available as part of the Economics and Business Education Faculty (FPEB).

Indonesian high school students may choose one of the three programmes: Science and Mathematics (Matematika dan Ilmu Alam), Social Science (Ilmu-Ilmu Sosial) and Language and Culture Studies (Ilmu Bahasa dan Budaya). While History is available in all programmes, a specialized history subject is available for the Social Science students (they study two subjects of history: General History/Sejarah Wajib and Specialized History/Sejarah Peminatan). Anthropology, in the other hand, is available for the students of Language and Culture Studies. Even so, students from the other programme may choose a maximum of two subjects from the other programme as an 'extra subject' (lintas minat) freely of their interest.

For this reason, the programmes available in all of UPI's faculties are also aimed to handle this 'lintas minat' as well as corresponding to the new curriculum system (which enables this 'lintas minat').

=== Faculty of Languages and Literature Education (FPBS) ===
The dean of the Faculty of Languages and Arts Education is Prof. Dr. Didi Suherdi, M. Ed.

List of programmes of Faculty of Languages and Arts Education:

- Education of Indonesian
- Education of Sundanese
- Education of English
- Education of Germany
- Education of Japanese
- Education of Arabic
- Education of French
- Education of Korean
- Studies of Indonesian Language and Literature
- Studies of English Language and Literature

=== Faculty of Art and Design Education (FPSD) ===
The FPSD was born by separating the art and design programmes from the Faculty of Languages and Literature (FPBS). Their building is at the old building of FPBS.

List of programmes of the Faculty of Art and Design Education:

- Education of Visual Art
- Education of Arts of Music
- Education of Arts of Dance
- Visual Communication of Design
- Film and Television

=== Faculty of Mathematics and Natural Science Education (FPMIPA) ===
The dean of the Faculty of Mathematics and Natural Science Education is Siti Fatimah, M.Si., Ph.D.

List of programmes of the Faculty of Mathematics and Natural Science Education:

- Education of Mathematics
- Education of Physics
- Education of Biology
- Education of Chemistry
- Mathematics
- Physics
- Biology
- Chemistry
- Education of Computer Science
- Computer Science
- International Program on Science Education

=== Faculty of Technology and Industrial Education (FPTI) ===
The dean of the Faculty of Technology and Industrial Education is Dr. Iwa Kuntadi, S.Pd., M.Pd.

List of programmes of the faculty:

- Education of Civil Engineering
- Education of Building Engineering
- Education of Architecture Engineering
- Education of Electrical Engineering
- Education of Machinery Engineering
- Education of Culinary Art
- Education of Fashion Art
- Education of Family Welfare
- Agroindustry Engineering
- Electrical Energy Engineering
- Electrical Engineering
- Civil Engineering
- Housing Engineering
- Machinery Engineering
- Architecture
- Logistics Engineering

=== Faculty of Sports and Health Education (FPOK) ===
The dean of the Faculty of Sports and Health Education is Prof. Dr. H. Adang Suherman, M.A.

List of programmes of the faculty:

- Physical, Health and Recreational Education
- Elementary School Sports Teacher Education
- Science of Sports
- Education of Sports Coaching
- Physical Sport Coaching
- Nursing (Diploma III)

=== Faculty of Economics and Business Education (FPEB) ===
The dean of the Faculty of Economics and Business Education is Dr. Edi Suryadi, M.Si

List of programmes of the faculty:

- Education of Economics and Cooperation
- Education of Business Management
- Education of Office Management
- Education of Accountings
- Accountings
- Management
- Science of Islamic Economy and Finance

School of Postgraduate UPI

Vision and mission :

Reflecting on the performance and achievement of the vision in the last five years as outlined in the 2020-2025 SPs UPI Strategic Plan and continuing the successes that have been achieved previously, namely gaining international recognition in the Southeast Asian region in providing postgraduate education, the vision and mission of SPs UPI is formulated as follows.

Obtaining International Recognition in the Implementation of Postgraduate Education in the Field of Education, Discipline Education and Professional Education at the Asian Level in 2025

The intended international recognition is achieved through improving the quality of governance with international standards, increasing the number of international students (in bound and out bound), increasing the quantity and quality of international cooperation, as well as increasing the capacity of lecturers to gain international recognition, and increasing the types/academic programs that receive international recognition. international recognition.

== Regional campuses ==
=== Cibiru Campus ===
List of programmes:

- Elementary School Education
- Preschool/Early Childhood Education
- Multimedia Education
- Software Engineering
- Computer Engineering

=== Tasikmalaya Campus ===
List of programmes:

- Elementary School Education
- Preschool/Early Childhood Education
- Entrepreneurship
- Digital Business
- Industrial Product Design

=== Sumedang Campus ===
List of programmes:

- Elementary School Education
- Physical Education for Elementary School Teachers
- Nursing
- Professional Nurse Education
- Tourism Industry
- Physical Education

=== Purwakarta Campus ===
List of programmes:

- Elementary School Education
- Preschool/Early Childhood Education
- Information Systems and Technology Education
- Telecommunication Systems
- Mechatronics and Artificial Intelligence

=== Serang Campus ===
List of programmes:

- Elementary School Education
- Preschool/Early Childhood Education
- Marine and Fisheries Education
- Marine Information Systems
- Marine Logistics

== List of rectors ==
- Sadarjoen Siswomartojo (1954-1961) (Dean of PTPG Bandung and Dean FKIP Padjadjaran University 1957-1961)
- M.A. Gazali Soerianatasoedjana dan Harsojo (1961-1963) Dean of FKIP Unpad A dan B
- Roeslan Abdulgani (1964-1966) (First Rector of IKIP Bandung)
- Achmad Sanusi (1966-1971)
- Garnadi Prawirasudirjo (1971-1978)
- Muhammad Nu'man Somantri (1978-1987)
- Mas Abdul Kodir(1987-1995)
- Mohammad Fakry Gaffar (1995-2005) (First Rector while changed into UPI)
- Sunaryo Kartadinata (2005-2015)
- H. Furqon (2015–2017) (died while in office)
- Asep Kadarohman (2017–2020) (substitute between time rector 2015-2020)
- Prof. Dr. H. M. Solehuddin, M.Pd., M.A. (2020–2025)
- Prof. Dr. Didi Sukyadi, M.A. (2025–present)
