= Brawijaya University =

Public university in Malang, Indonesia

Coordinates: 7°57′21″S 112°36′57″E

- Universitas Brawijaya
- University emblem
- Former names: Gemeentelijke Universiteit
- Motto: Building Up Noble Future
- Type: Public university
- Established: 5 January 1963; 63 years ago
- Affiliations: ASAIHL, UA&P, AUN, SEAMEO SEARCA, FUIW, ASEA UNINET
- Endowment: Rp5.12 trillion (FY 2018)
- Rector: Prof. Widodo, S.Si., M.Si., Ph.D.Med.Sc., IPU., ASEAN Eng.
- Academic staff: 2,485
- Students: 47,469
- Undergraduates: 40,613
- Postgraduates: 6,875
- Location: Malang, East Java, Indonesia
- Campus: Urban (981 Hectares)
- Colors: Navy blue
- Mascot: BRONE (Brawijaya Number One)
- Website: ub.ac.id

Brawijaya University (Indonesian: Universitas Brawijaya (Note: formerly named Universitas Kotapraja Malang as private university in 1957–1960, before changed to current name Universitas Brawijaya as public university since 1961.); Javanese: ꦈꦤꦶꦮ꦳ꦼꦂꦱꦶꦠꦱ꧀ꦧꦿꦮꦶꦗꦪ abbreviated as UB (Note: UB (official), UNIBRAW or UNBRAW (less common).)), is an autonomous state university in Indonesia established on 5 January 1963, in Malang, East Java.

Brawijaya University has 47,469 students from 18 faculties and 221 departments, ranging from the vocational, undergraduate, graduate, postgraduate, and medical specialist programs.

There are four campuses that UB possesses, two of them are located in Malang at Veteran and Dieng, then the rest are in Kediri and Jakarta. The main campus is located in the western part of Malang City with the total area of 60 hectares. It's a very strategic location and it has a great infrastructure. The campus has pleasant climate with a good amount of trees and fresh air.

== History ==
The name of Brawijaya was granted by the president of the Republic of Indonesia through a wire sent on 11 July 1961. This name is derived from the title of kings of Majapahit, a great kingdom in Indonesia from the twelfth to fifteenth century. The University of Brawijaya transformed into a state university on 5 January 1963, following a presidential decree issued earlier in the same year. This date was later promulgated as University of Brawijaya's anniversary (especially called Dies Natalies among Indonesian academic society members). Before its transformation into a state university in 1967, University of Brawijaya had started its operation in 1957 in Malang, as a branch of the University of Sawerigading Makassar. In those days, this Malang branch had two faculties: Law and Economics. Then, on 1 July 1960, its name was changed to the Municipal University of Malang. Under the new name, two more faculties were established a few months later: Administration Sciences and Agriculture.

At the time of its transformation into a state university, University of Brawijaya had five faculties: Law, Economics, State Governance and Trade Management (an extension of the Faculty of Trade Administration now called the Faculty of Administrative Science), Agriculture, and Veterinary and Animal Husbandry. In 1973, the Faculty of Veterinary and Animal Husbandry was then divided into the Faculty of Animal Husbandry and the Faculty of Veterinary, which were under Airlangga University. The Faculty of Engineering was established in 1963 based on a decree form the Ministry of Universities and Education Science in the same year.

In 1982, due to a change in University of Brawijaya's organizational structure, the Faculty of Fishery became a separate faculty (since 1977, it had been under the Faculty of Animal Husbandry and Fishery, which was later called the Faculty of Animal Husbandry). Before this date, the Faculty of Fishery had operated since 1963, in Probolinggo, a town about three hours to the northeast from Malang, as a department under University of Brawijaya's Faculty of Veterinary and Agriculture of University of Brawijaya. The Faculty of Medicine has officially been under University of Brawijaya since 1974. Since its establishment, it had been under the Foundation of Higher Education of East Java. The Faculty of Mathematics and Natural Sciences was inaugurated following a decree from the Ministry of Education and Culture dated October 21, 1993. The University of Brawijaya added one more faculty: the Faculty of Agricultural Technology, which was upgraded from the Department of Agricultural Technology, which had been under the Faculty of Agriculture.

The hymn of University of Brawijaya was composed by a student of the Faculty of Veterinary and Animal Husbandry called Yanardhana in 1963, while the march of University of Brawijaya was composed by Lilik Sugiarto in 1996. Both songs are still frequently sung.

== Faculties and School ==
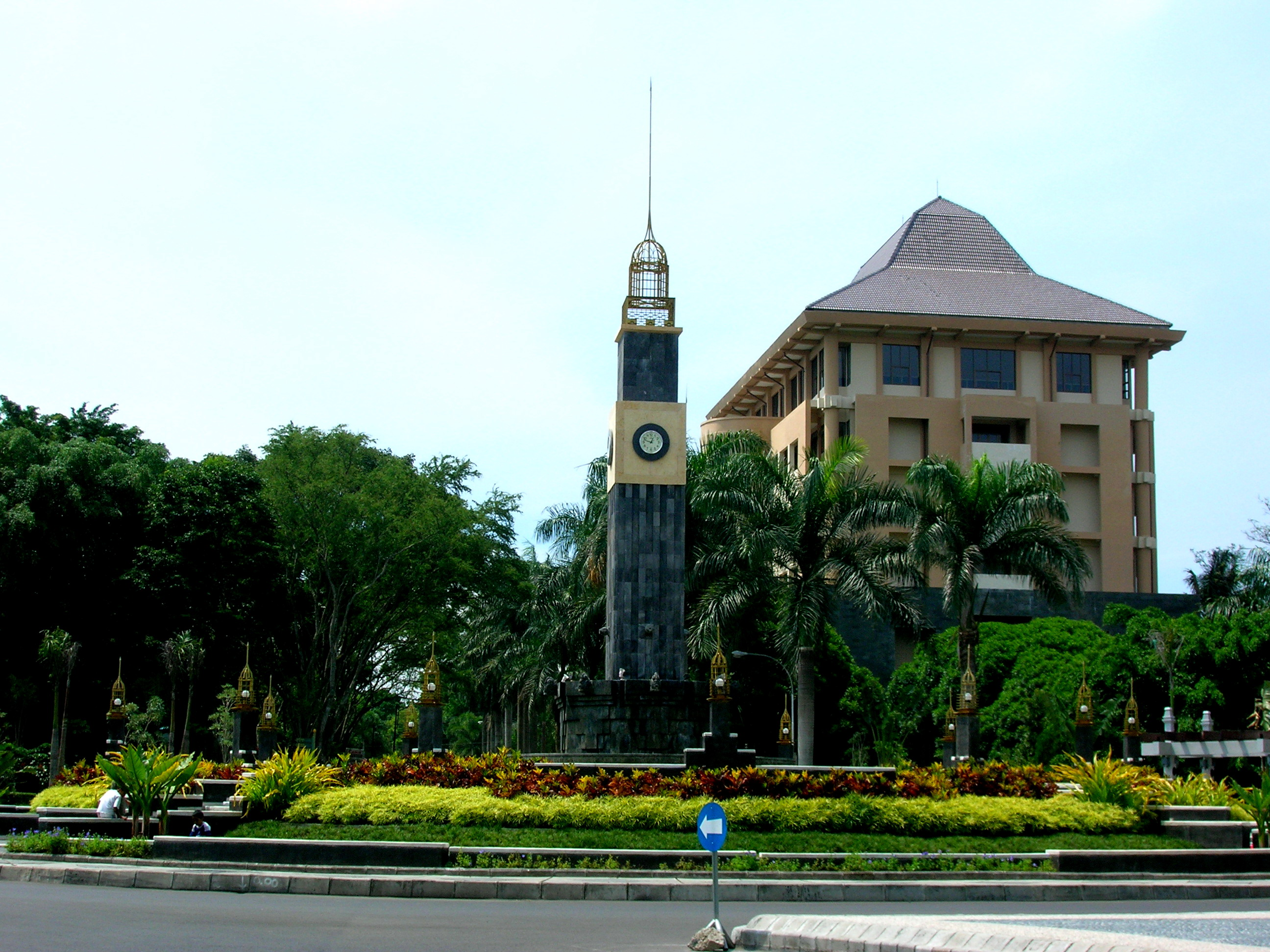
Brawijaya aerial view

- Faculty of Law
- Faculty of Economics and Business
- Faculty of Administrative Sciences
- Faculty of Agriculture
- Faculty of Animal Husbandry
- Faculty of Engineering
- Faculty of Medicine
- Faculty of Health Science
- Faculty of Fisheries and Marine Sciences
- Faculty of Mathematics and Natural Sciences
- Faculty of Agricultural Technology
- Faculty of Social and Political Sciences
- Faculty of Cultural Studies
- Faculty of Dentistry
- Faculty of Computer Science
- Faculty of Veterinary
- School of Vocational Education

== Student activities ==
These are executing units for extracurricular activities university-wide. These activity units are divided based on their characters/fields:

=== Students' Representative Council ===
- EM (Students' Executive/Eksekutif Mahasiswa)
- DPM (Students' Representative Council/Dewan Perwakilan Mahasiswa)
- BEM F (Faculty Students' Executive/Badan Eksekutif Mahasiswa Fakultas)
- DPM F (Faculty Students' Representative Council/Dewan Perwakilan Mahasiswa Fakultas)
- Himpunan Jurusan/Program Studi (Majoring Students Association)

=== Faith and reason interest ===
- FORMASI (Student Forum for English Conversation)
- FORDIMAPELAR (Student Forum for Reason Development)
- UAPKM (Activity Unit of Campus Press)
- IAAS (International Association of Students in Agricultural and Related Sciences)
- LPM Manifest Law Faculty (Law Press students Association)
- AIESEC
- FPCI

=== Sports interest ===
- Badminton
- Basketball
- Chess
- Football
- Karate
- Kempo
- Kendo
- Pencak Silat
- Shooting Sport
- Swimming
- Taekwondo
- Tennis
- Volleyball, etc.

=== Art interest ===
- Band
- Choir
- Dance and Traditional Music of Karawitan
- Marching Band
- Theater
- NOLDERAJAT (Student Forum and Training for Cinematography)

=== Special interest ===
- Drug Abuse and HIV/AIDS Prevention Team
- Nature Lover Students
- Scout Gerakan Pramuka
- Student Regiment
- Voluntary Corps

=== Student welfare interest ===
- KOPMA (Student Cooperative)
- UAKB (Activity Unit for Buddhism Spirituality)
- UAKI (Activity Unit for Islamic Spirituality)
- UAKK (Activity Unit for Christian Spirituality)
- UAKKat (Activity Unit for Catholic Spirituality)
- UNIKAHIDHA (Activity Unit for Hindu Spirituality)

== Rankings ==
University rankings

Global – Overall
- QS World: =680 (2026)
- QS Employability: 711-720 (2025)

Regional – Overall
- QS Asia: 172 (2025)

The QS Asia University Rangkings 2024 has ranks Universitas Brawijaya as number 49. Meanwhile, in the QS World University Rankings 2026, the Brawijaya University ranked in 680 globally and ranked ninth in Indonesia.

In the Times Higher Education World University Rankings 2024, Brawijaya University is ranked in the range of 1501+ globally.

=== Subject ===
QS World University Rankings by Subject 2026

World rank	Subject
251 – 300	Agriculture & Forestry
301 – 350	▲ Law; Accounting & Finance
351 – 400	
401 – 450	
451 – 500	Business & Management Studies; ▼ Economics & Econometrics
501 – 550	
551 – 600	
601 – 650	
651 – 700	
701 – 750	Medicine

QS by Clusters (2026)
Subject	Global	National
Arts & Humanities	-	-
Engineering and Technology	-	-
Life Sciences & Medicine	-	-
Natural Sciences	-	-
Social Sciences & Management	▲451-500	▲6

THE World University Rankings by Subject 2026
Subject	Global	National
Arts & humanities	-	-
Business & economics	801-1000	▲12
Computer science	1001+	▼14
Education	601-800	▼13
Engineering	1251+	▼21
Law	▲301-350	▼10
Life sciences	1001+	▼16
Medical & Health	1001+	▼10
Physical sciences	▲1001-1250	▲11
Psychology	-	-
Social sciences	1001+	▼26

== Award ==
A medical student was awarded the second prize in the Indonesian Science Institute (LIPI) experiment competition. Using lab rats, he found salmonella bacteria can get rid of fatty residue in subject's arteries which may be used as a future remedy for people suffering from heart disease.

== International cooperation ==
- Kassel University, Germany
- Universität Leipzig, Germany
- Miyazaki University, Japan
- Yamaguchi University, Japan
- International Institute of Multicultural Studies Annaka, Japan
- Kumamoto University, Japan
- Shibaura Institute of Technology, Japan
- Burapha University, Thailand
- Kyungpook National University, South Korea
- Chiayi University, Taiwan
- Massey University, New Zealand
- University of Wollongong, Australia
- University of Canberra, Australia
