= Sebelas Maret University =

University in Indonesia

- Universitas Sebelas Maret
- Former names: Universitas Negeri Surakarta Sebelas Maret
- Motto: Mangesthi Luhur Ambangun Nagara (Old Javanese)
- Motto in English: Aspire Sublimely to Build Country
- Type: Public university
- Established: 11 March 1976; 49 years ago (as Universitas Negeri Surakarta Sebelas Maret); 1982 (as Universitas Sebelas Maret)
- Affiliations: ASAIHL, SEAMEO, AUN, AACSB Accredited
- Rector: Hartono
- Academic staff: 1,575
- Students: 34,000
- Undergraduates: 29,000
- Postgraduates: 4,592
- Doctoral students: 233
- Location: Surakarta, Central Java, Indonesia
- Campus: Suburban 148.2 acres (0.600 km^{2})
- Colors: Turquoise
- Website: www.uns.ac.id

Sebelas Maret University (Indonesian: Universitas Sebelas Maret, abbreviated as UNS, lit mean March Eleventh University) is a public university in Surakarta, Central Java, Indonesia. It was officially founded on 11 March 1976.

== History ==
Since the 1950s, the city of Surakarta sought a local public university, considering other cities in Indonesia as of then had established decades-old higher education institutions. However, due to insurgencies, political struggles, reformations, economic collapses, and other events, plans for foundations were abandoned.

In 1953, these foundations were redeveloped, as Surakarta saw itself as the center of Javanese culture and possessed great potential in education. The committees of the university's foundation were created, and led by the mayor of Surakarta at the time, Mohammad Saleh Werdisastro. However, these plans were forfeited once again due to several things; lack of financial resources both from regional and central government, the emergence of aspirations among groups to independently establish private universities, and the lack of support from individuals at Gadjah Mada University. In addition, several constructions in Surakarta and power struggles among political parties also added to the project's hiatus.

In 1963, Universitas Kota Praja Surakarta (UKPS) was established. This university was initiated by the regional government at the time, led by Utomo Ramelan. Simultaneously, it was the growth of the Communist Party of Indonesia. Many life aspects were influenced, including those in UKPS, where socialism gained popularity. As the Thirtieth September Movement erupted, UKPS was ultimately shut down, and all institutions and ideals associated with socialism or communism were subsequently banned.

In 1966, Universitas Nasional Saraswati applied for a transition from a private university to a public one, to which the Department of Education and Culture agreed. Along with other institutions, a new, unified university was founded, named Combined University of Surakarta (UGS). At the end of December 1975, the Department of Education and Culture assessed UGS and planned to make it public on March 11, 1976.

Sebelas Maret University was established on March 11, 1976. It was named Universitas Negeri Surakarta (State University of Surakarta), hence was abbreviated "UNS". Sebelas Maret University is the result of the unification of the five universities in Surakarta, which were:

- Institute of Teacher Training and Education of Surakarta.
- Sports High School of Surakarta.
- Academy of Business Administration of Surakarta.
- Combined University of Surakarta, which comprised several universities in Surakarta, including University of Islam Indonesia of Surakarta.
- Faculty of Medicine of the Department of Defense and Security's National Higher Education Development of Surakarta.

Leading to the establishment of UNS, nine faculties were formed, which were:

- Faculty of Educational Sciences
- Faculty of Teacher Training
- Faculty of Literature and Culture
- Faculty of Social and Political Sciences
- Faculty of Law
- Faculty of Economics
- Faculty of Medicine
- Faculty of Agriculture
- Faculty of Engineering

Physical development began in 1980. Under the leadership of Dr. Prakosa, the original campus located in several places were united in the same area. The new area was in Kentingan, on the riverside of Bengawan Solo River, with an area of 60 hectares. In this Kentingan area, the first phase of campus construction ended in 1985.

In 1986, Prof. Dr. Koento Wibisono became rector, who also introduced rapid developments to the campus, including those relating to academics, staff members, and infrastructures. Prof. Haris Mudjiman, Ph.D. became the next rector.

== Rankings ==
University rankings

Regional – Overall
- QS Asia: =221 (2025)

=== Subject ===
QS World University Rankings by Subject 2026

World rank	Subject
251 – 300	Art & Design
301 – 350	Accounting & Finance
351 – 400	Law
401 – 450	Agriculture & Forestry; ▼ Economics & Econometrics
451 – 500	
501 – 550	
551 – 600	▲ Business & Management Studies
601 – 650	
651 – 700	
701 – 750	

QS by Clusters (2026)
Subject	Global	National
Arts & Humanities	501-550	8
Engineering and Technology	-	-
Life Sciences & Medicine	-	-
Natural Sciences	-	-
Social Sciences & Management	501-550	9

THE World University Rankings by Subject 2026
Subject	Global	National
Arts & humanities	401-600	2
Business & economics	-	-
Computer science	1001+	▼12
Education	▲301-400	▲4
Engineering	1001-1250	10
Law	201-250	▼2
Life sciences	1001+	▼12
Medical & Health	▲801-1000	▲7
Physical sciences	801-1000	1
Psychology	-	-
Social sciences	601-800	▲4

== Symbol and philosophy ==
The symbol of UNS is a flower with four petals as the visualization of the nation, the name of the nation and the state. The petals at the top, right, and left sides are the embodiment of tri dharma colleges. The one petal under consists of five units that symbolize the principles of Pancasila. The four petals form a line in sequence to depict the academic unity of UNS.

The flower's pistil head shape is described as Wiku which derives from Pali, meaning "the learned people." A circular writing that is similar to Javanese script is a calculation of Sangkala Candra (letters that stand for and correspond to a date in the Javanese counting system) "Mangesthi Luhur Ambangun Nagara," which symbolizes the year 1908 in Javanese calendar, or 1976 AD, the founding year of UNS.

Overall, the symbol of UNS visualizes ideals to build a nation. The Candra Sangkala is arranged similarly to a shining Praba, Praba in the history of religion and puppet used by the holy man who is wise and virtuous. The central element of the symbol, Wiku brain (the learned man), is described as a flame, suggesting light that illuminates the eternity of science, toward human welfare. Turquoise blue's color is a symbol of a pledge of allegiance and devotion to nation, state, homeland, and science.

== Achievements ==
The increasing quality of the graduates has been marked by the improvement of the grade point averages (GPA), Education Efficiency Figure (Angka Efisiensi Edukasi/AEE), cum laude graduates, and the reduction of study periods. Nationally, UNS is in 11th position in Ministry of Research, Technology and Higher Education's 2017 ranking.

== Faculties ==
The university has thirteen faculties and two schools providing courses at the diploma, undergraduate, professional, and specialist levels. Some graduate and postgraduate courses are managed by the Postgraduate School.

- Faculty of Agriculture
- Faculty of Cultural Sciences
- Faculty of Economics and Business
- Faculty of Teacher Training and Education
- Faculty of Engineering
- Faculty of Fine Arts and Design
- Faculty of Law
- Faculty of Mathematics and Natural Sciences
- Faculty of Medicine
- Faculty of Social and Political Sciences
- Faculty of Sports
- Faculty of Psychology
- Faculty of Information Technology and Data Science
- Postgraduate School
- Vocational School

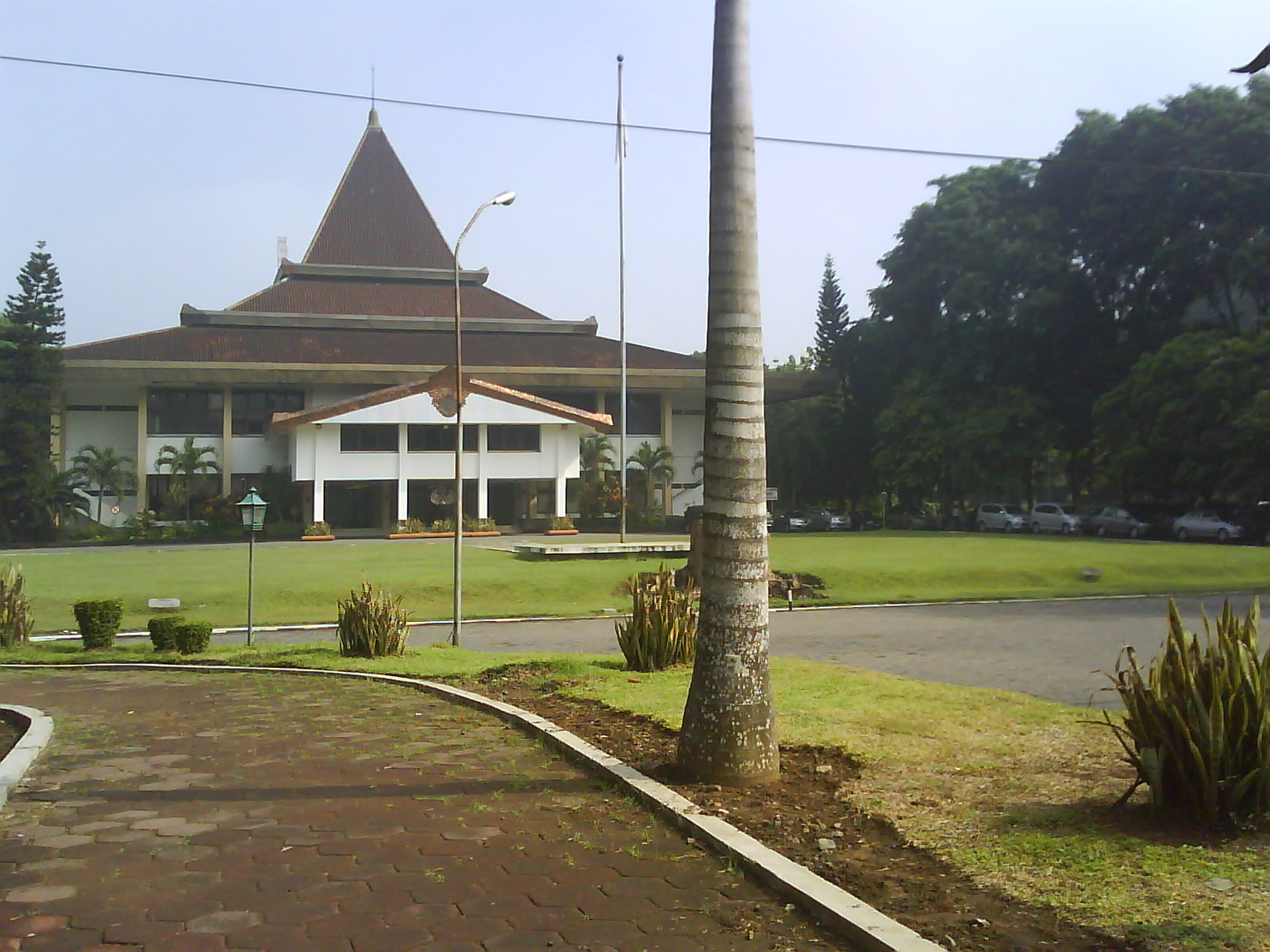
Rectorate building

== Image gallery ==
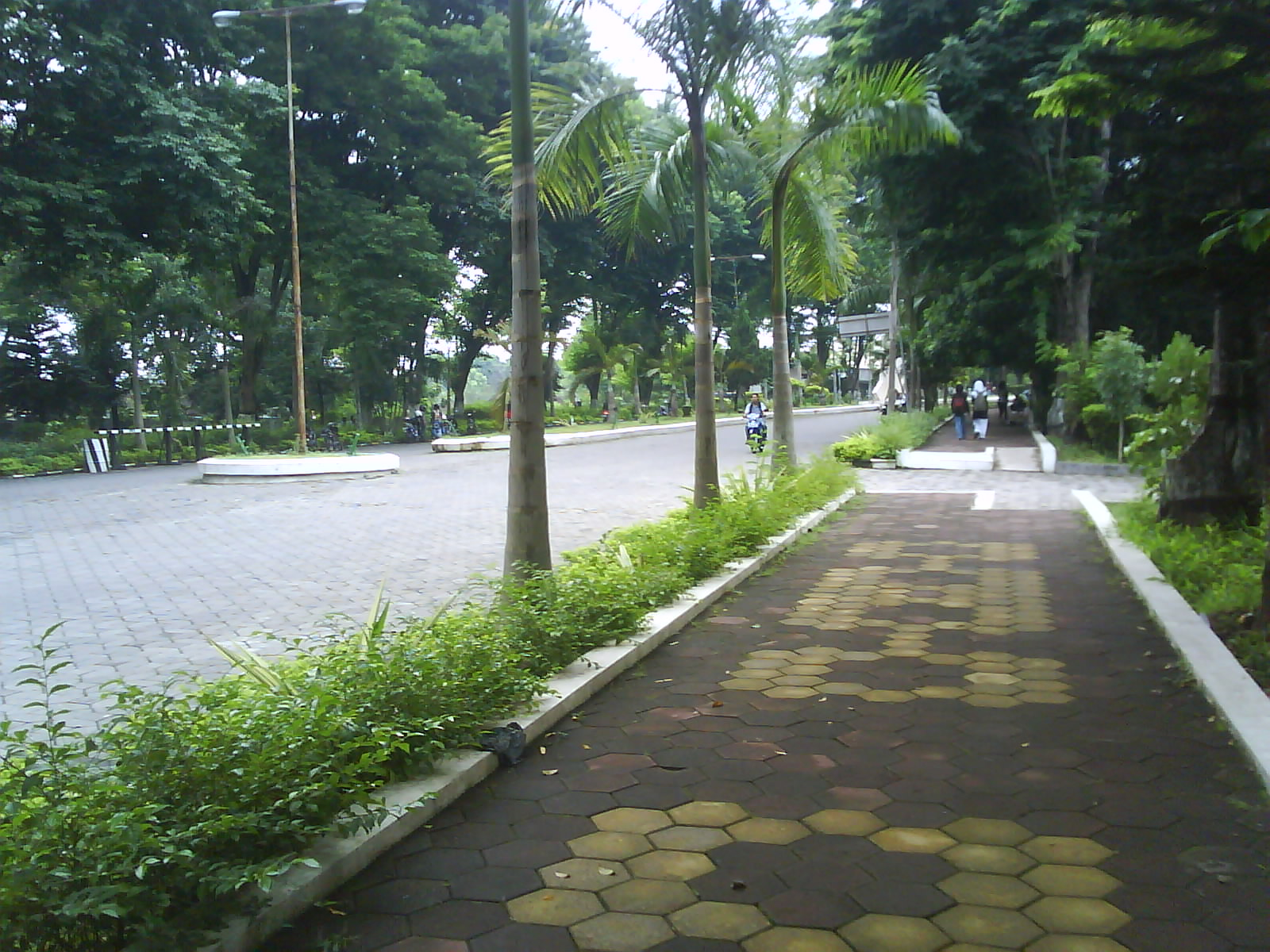
South boulevard

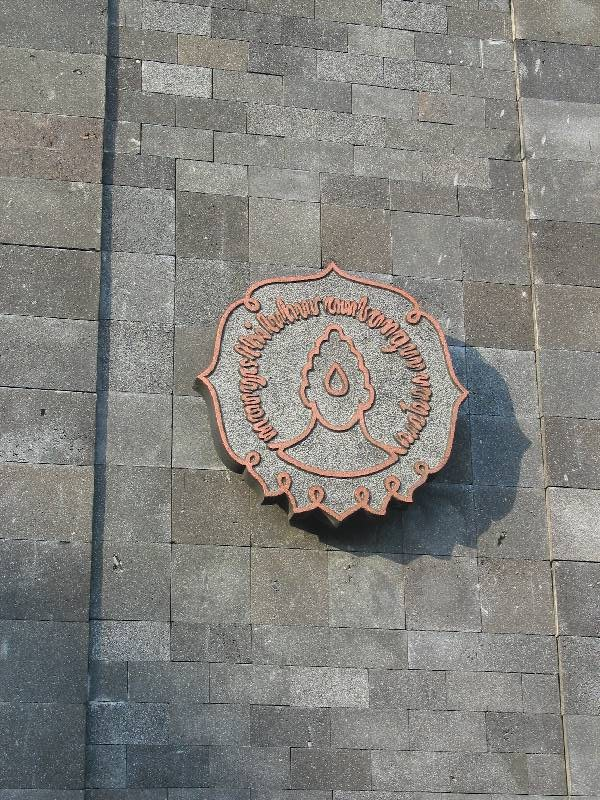
University logo on the south gate

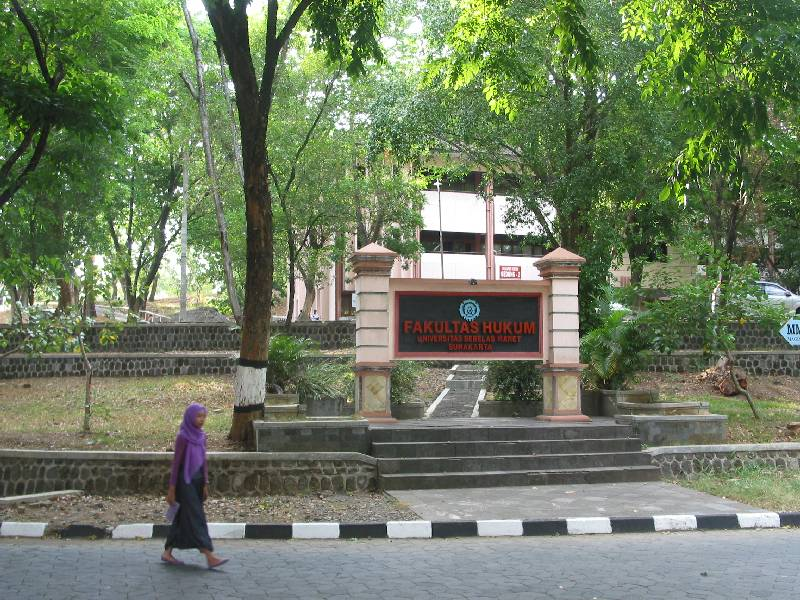
Faculty of Law nameplate

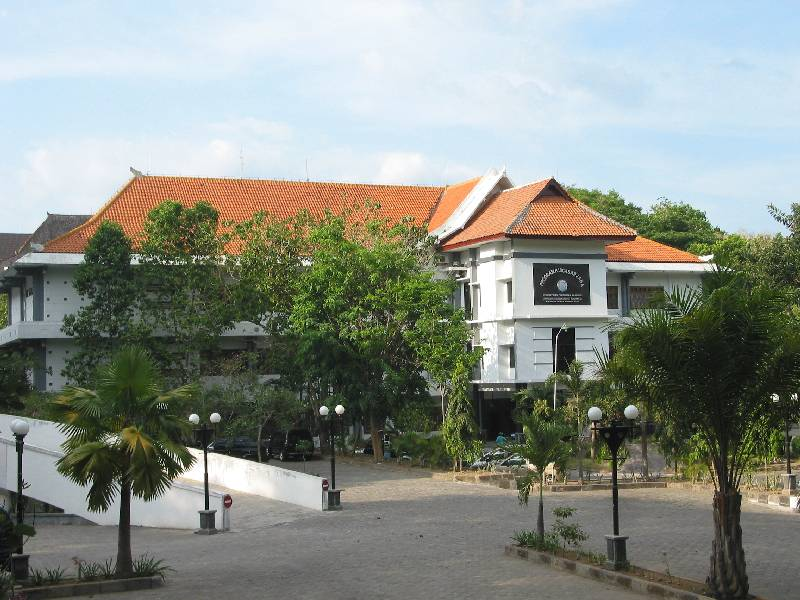
Postgraduate building

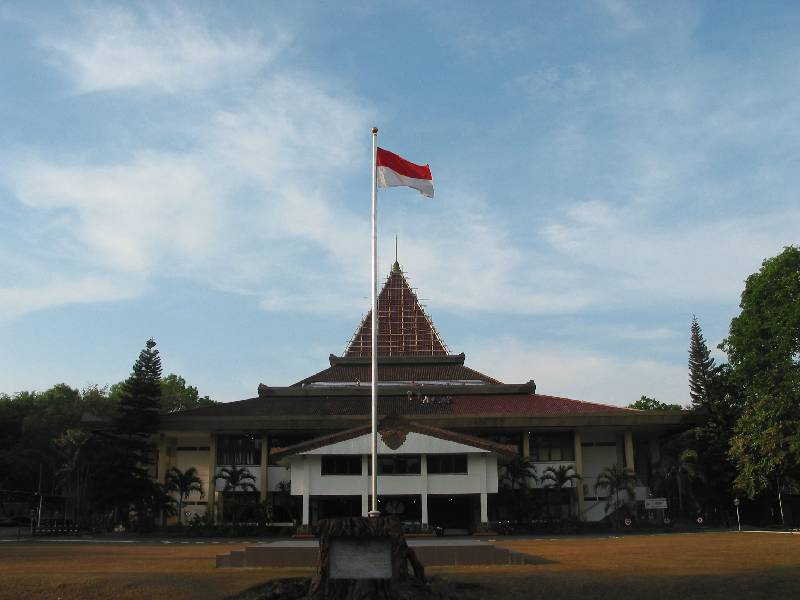
Rectorate building

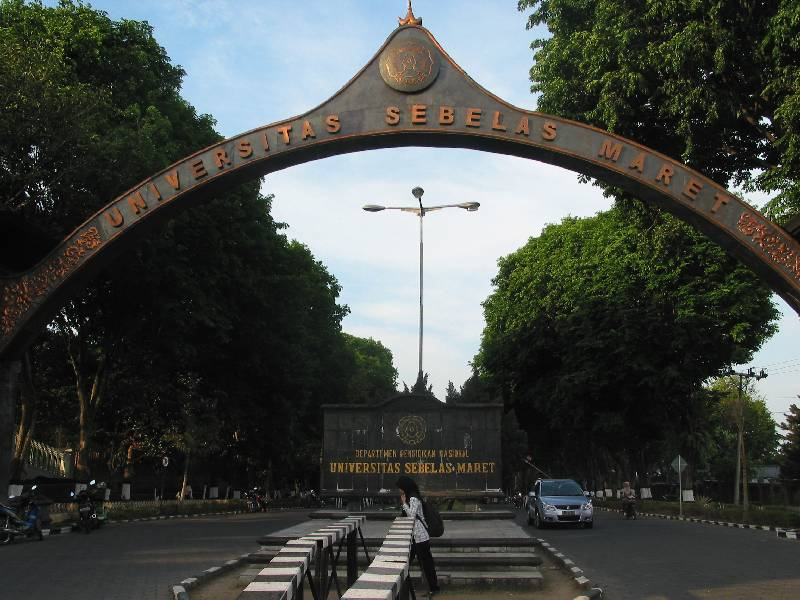
Front gate (South)
