= List of Indonesian agricultural universities and colleges =

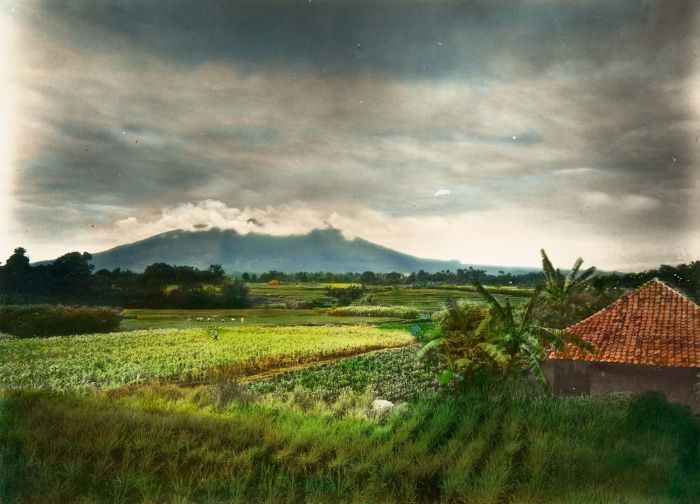
Agricultural training institute, Bogor, 1920-30

This article lists agricultural universities, academies / polytechniques and colleges in Indonesia, by region.

== Bali and Nusa Tenggara ==
=== Bali ===
- Udayana University

=== East Nusa Tenggara ===
- Artha Wacana Christian University, Kupang
- Kupang State Agricultural Polytechnique, Kupang
- Nusa Nipa University, Maumere, Flores

=== West Nusa Tenggara ===
- Muhammadiyah University, Mataram
- University of Mataram, Mataram

== Java ==
=== Banten ===
- Indonesian College of Technology, Tangerang
- Jakarta Islamic State University, Ciputat, South Tangerang
- Sultan Ageng Tirtayasa University, Serang, Banten

=== Central Java ===
- Baruna Fishery Academy, Slawi
- Diponegoro University, Semarang
- Jenderal Soedirman University, Purwokerto
- Satya Wacana Christian University, Salatiga
- Sebelas Maret University, Surakarta
- Slamet Riyadi University, Surakarta
- Soegijapranata Catholic University, Semarang
- Widya Dharma University, Klaten

=== East Java ===
- Brawijaya University, Malang
- Cipta Wacana Christian University, Malang
- Jember State Polytechnique, Jember
- Jember University, Jember
- Malang College of Agriculture, Malang
- Muhammadiyah University, Malang
- PGRI University, Banyuwangi
- Tribhuwana Tungga Dewi University, Malang
- Trunojoyo University, Bangkalan, Madura
- Widya Gama University, Malang
- Wijaya Kusuma University, Surabaya
- Yudharta University, Pasuruan

=== Jakarta ===
- Mercu Buana University

=== West Java ===
- Bogor Agricultural University, Bogor
- Djuanda University, Bogor
- Nusantara Islamic University, Bandung
- Padjadjaran University, Bandung
- Polytechnique of Agroindustry, Subang
- Winaya Mukti University, Sumedang

=== Yogyakarta ===
- Estate Education College, Yogyakarta
- Gadjah Mada University, Yogyakarta
- Institute for Plantation Agriculture (INSTIPER), Yogyakarta
- Janabadra University, Yogyakarta
- National Development University "Veteran", Yogyakarta
- Semarang University, Yogyakarta
- Yogyakarta Institute of Agriculture (INTAN), Yogyakarta

== Kalimantan ==
=== Central Kalimantan ===
- University of Palangka Raya, Palangkaraya
- Christian University of Palangka Raya, Palangkaraya

=== East Kalimantan ===
- East Kutai School of Agriculture, East Kutai Regency
- Mulawarman University, Samarinda
- Samarinda State Agricultural Polytechnique, Samarinda

=== South Kalimantan ===
- Lambung Mangkurat University, Banjarbaru
- Syekh Salman Al-Farisi Islamic Polytechnique, Tapin Regency
- Tanah Laut Polytechnique, Pelaihari, Tanah Laut Regency

=== West Kalimantan ===
- Agribusiness Management Academy, Sanggau
- Bumi Sebalo Agribusiness Academy, Bengkayang
- Tanjungpura University, Pontianak
- Tonggak Ekuator Polytechnique, Pontianak

== Mollucas ==
=== Maluku ===
- University of Pattimura, Ambon

=== North Maluku ===
- Agricultural Faculty Khairun University, Ternate

== Papua ==
=== Papua ===
- Agricultural Polytechnique of Yasanto, Merauke
- Cenderawasih University, Jayapura
- Musamus University, Merauke
- Santo Thomas Aquinas Agricultural College, Jayapura

=== West Papua ===
- State University of Papua, Manokwari

== Sulawesi ==
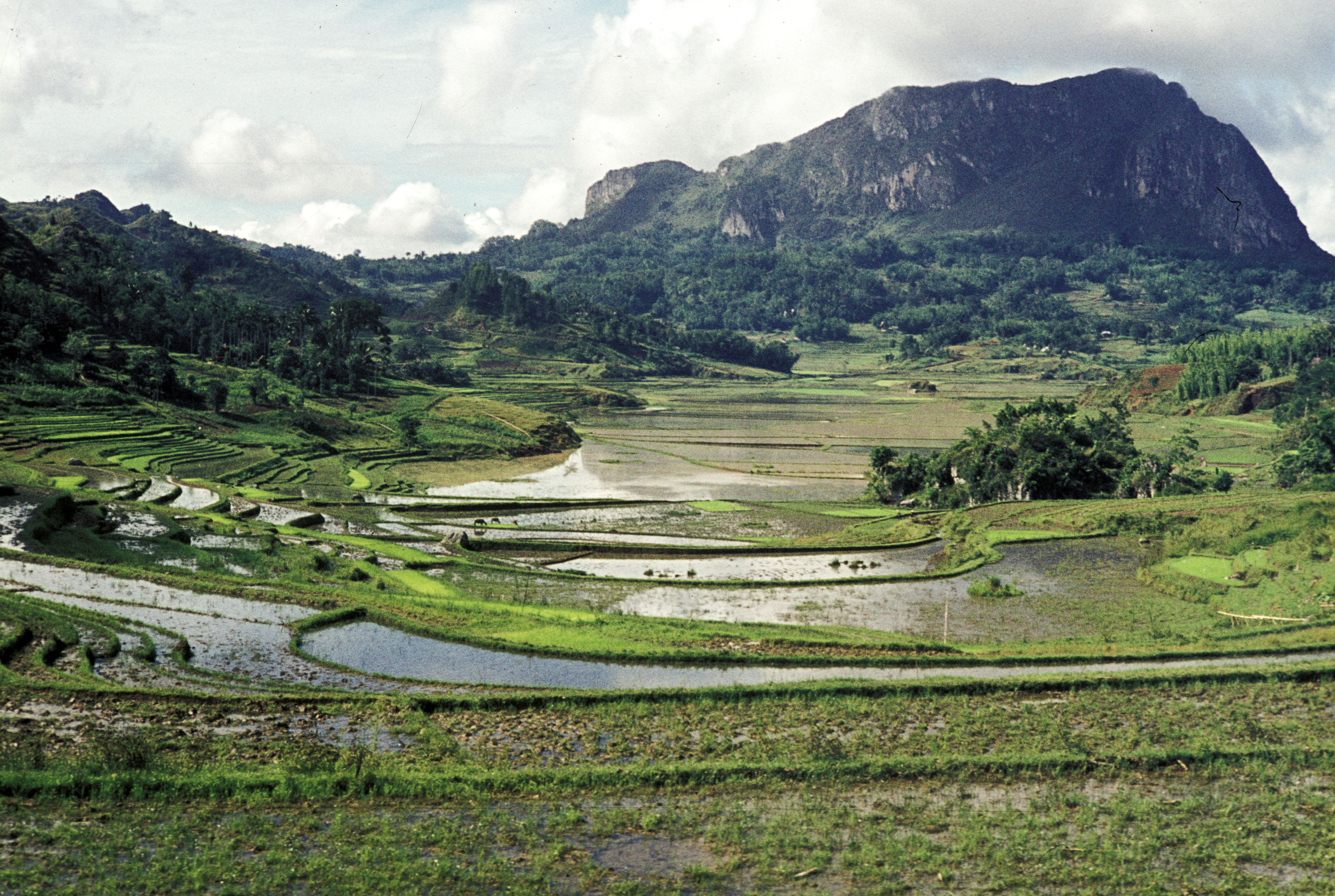
Sulawesi, 1977

=== Central Sulawesi ===
- Alkhairaat University, Palu
- College of Fishery and Marine, Palu
- Polytechnique of Palu, Palu
- Tadulako University, Palu

=== Gorontalo ===
- Ichsan University of Gorontalo, Gorontalo
- Polytechnique of Gorontalo, Gorontalo
- University of Gorontalo, Gorontalo
- State University of Gorontalo, Gorontalo

=== North Sulawesi ===
- De La Salle Catholic University, Manado
- Indonesian Christian University, Tomohon
- North Sulawesi Technological University, Manado
- Nusantara University, Manado
- Sam Ratulangi University, Manado
- Sariputra Buddhist University, Tomohon

=== South East Sulawesi ===
- Haluoleo University, Kendari
- Kendari University, Kendari

=== South Sulawesi ===
- Cokroaminoto University, Makassar
- East Indonesia University, Makassar
- Hasanudin University, Makassar
- Pancasakti University, Makassar

=== West Sulawesi ===
- University of West Sulawesi, Mamasa

== Sumatra ==
=== Aceh ===
- Syiah Kuala University, Banda Aceh
- Teuku Umar University, Meulaboh
- University of Serambi Mekah
- Venezuela Polytechnique, Aceh Besar

=== Bengkulu ===
- Bengkulu University, Bengkulu
- Dehasen University, Bengkulu

=== Jambi ===
- Jambi University, Jambi City

=== Lampung ===
- Lampung State Agricultural Polytechnique
- Lampung State Polytechnique
- Lampung University

=== North Sumatra ===
- Agricultural Academy, Gunung Sitoli
- Islamic University of North Sumatra, Medan
- Muhammadiyah University, Medan
- Nommensen HPBP University, Medan
- Preston University, Medan
- Quality University, Medan
- Santo Thomas University, Medan
- Simalungun University, Pematangsiantar
- Tugu 405 Polytechnique, Medan
- University of North Sumatra, Medan

=== Riau ===
- Indragiri Islamic University, Tembilahan
- Pasir Pangaraian University, Rokan Hulu Regency
- Riau University, Pekanbaru

=== South Sumatra ===
- Muhammadiyah University, Palembang
- Sriwijaya University, Palembang
- University of Musi Rawas, Lubuklinggau

=== West Sumatra ===
- Agricultural Development Academy of Lubung Alung, Pariaman
- Andalas University, Padang
- Ekasakti University, Padang
- Payakumbuh State Agricultural Polytechnique, Payakumbuh
- Science and Technology College of Padang, Padang

== See also ==
- Agriculture in Indonesia
- Education in Indonesia
- List of agricultural universities and colleges
- List of forestry technical schools
- List of forestry universities and colleges
- List of universities in Indonesia
