= Utu (disambiguation) =

Utu or UTU can refer to the following things:

- Utu, a Sumerian deity
- Utu language
- Utu (Māori concept), a Māori word referring to a ritualised revenge or payback to restore balance
  - Utu (film), a New Zealand film
- Utu (gunboat), an Estonian gunboat during World War II
- The United Transportation Union
- Untriunium, a hypothetical chemical element
- Utu, Estonia, village in Käina Parish, Hiiu County, Estonia
- Fibera KK-1e Utu, glider
- Fainu'ulelei S. Utu (1924-1974), American Samoan politician

== In education ==
- The Ulster Teachers' Union
- The United Transportation Union
- Teuku Umar University (Universitas Teuku Umar), a university in Indonesia
- University of Turku in Finland
- Utah Tech University in St. George, Utah
- Uttarakhand Technical University, a state science and technology university in Uttarakhand, India
