= Asparaga =

- District
- Interactive map of Asparaga
- Location within Gorontalo Location within Sulawesi Location within Indonesia
- Coordinates: 0°46′17.8075″N 122°28′27.2100″E
- Country: Indonesia
- Province: Gorontalo
- Regency: Gorontalo Regency
- District seat: Karya Indah

Area
  - Total: 421.17 km^{2} (162.61 sq mi)

Population (2023)
  - Total: 13,964
  - Density: 33.155/km^{2} (85.872/sq mi)

Asparaga is a district in Gorontalo Regency, Gorontalo Province, Indonesia. In 2023, this district had a population of 13,964 people with an area of 421.17 km^{2}.

== Geography ==
Asparaga District borders directly with several administrative areas in Gorontalo Province. In the north, Asparaga borders North Gorontalo Regency. In the east, this area borders Mootilango District. Meanwhile, the southern and western parts of Asparaga border Boalemo Regency.

== Governance ==
=== Villages ===
Administratively, Asparaga District consists of 10 definitive villages (desa), namely:

Regional code	Name	Area (km²)	Population (2023)	Hamlets (dusun)
75.01.21.2001	Bululi	27.69	1,905	4
75.01.21.2002	Mohiyolo	7.37	1,894	3
75.01.21.2003	Pangahu	200.66	1,396	6
75.01.21.2004	Karya Indah	24.14	1,426	3
75.01.21.2005	Prima	23.05	1,137	4
75.01.21.2006	Tiohu	5.80	1,253	4
75.01.21.2007	Olimohulo	4.31	961	2
75.01.21.2008	Karya Baru	6.17	1,156	2
75.01.21.2009	Bontula	72.89	2,057	4
75.01.21.2010	Bihe	49.09	779	4
	Totals	421.17	13,964	36
