= Xingtai County =

Xingtai County 邢台县
- County
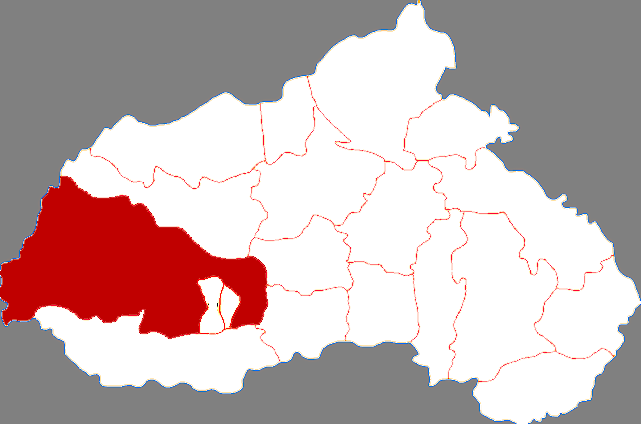
- Xingtai County in Xingtai City

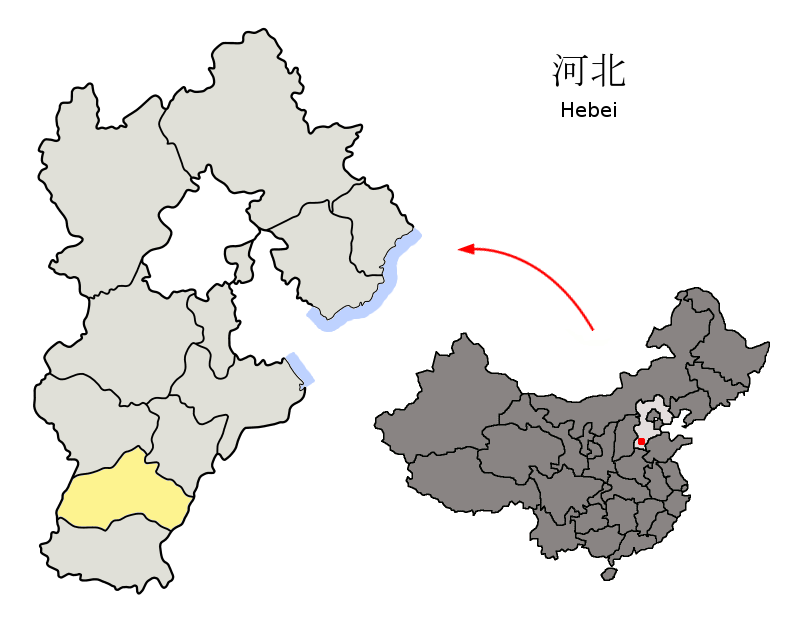
- Xingtai City in Hebei
- Coordinates: 37°7′N 114°34′E
- Country: People's Republic of China
- Province: Hebei
- Prefecture-level city: Xingtai

Area
  - Total: 1,983 km^{2} (766 sq mi)
- Elevation: 60 m (200 ft)

Population
  - Total: 450,000
  - Density: 230/km^{2} (590/sq mi)
- Time zone: UTC+8 (China Standard)
- Postal code: 054001

Xingtai County (simplified Chinese: 邢台县; traditional Chinese: 刑台縣 or 邢臺縣; pinyin: Xíngtái Xiàn) was a former county administered by the prefecture-level city of the same name, in the southwest of Hebei province, China, bordering Shanxi province to the west. It surrounds the two core districts of Xingtai on all sides except the south, though its seat of government is located in neighbouring Qiaodong District. The county has a population of 450,000 residing in an area of 1,983 km^{2} (766 sq mi). It's now split between Xindu and Xiangdu districts.

== History ==
Following the Xinhai Revolution and the collapse of the Qing dynasty, Shunde Prefecture (Chinese: 顺德府) was abolished in 1912, and the territory was reorganized as Xingtai County.

== Administrative divisions ==
The county administers 1 subdistrict, 13 towns, and 6 townships.

Subdistricts:

- Yurangqiao Subdistrict (豫让桥街道)

Towns:

- Dongwang (东汪镇)
- Wangkuai (王快镇)
- Zhucun (祝村镇)
- Yanjiatun (晏家屯镇)
- Nanshimen (南石门镇)
- Yangfan (羊范镇)
- Huangsi (皇寺镇)
- Huining (会宁镇)
- Xihuangcun (西黄村镇)
- Luluo (路罗镇)
- Jiangjunmu (将军墓镇)
- Jiangshui (浆水镇)
- Songjiazhuang (宋家庄镇)

Townships:

- Taizijing Township (太子井乡)
- Longquansi Township (龙泉寺乡)
- Beixiaozhuang Township (北小庄乡)
- Chengjitou Township (城计头乡)
- Bai'an Township (白岸乡)
- Jijiacun Township (冀家村乡)
