= Bilato =

- District
- Location within Gorontalo Location within Sulawesi Location within Indonesia
- Coordinates: 0°34′31.17734″N 122°38′15.73332″E
- Country: Indonesia
- Province: Gorontalo
- Regency: Gorontalo Regency
- District seat: Totopo

Area
  - Total: 119.15 km^{2} (46.00 sq mi)

Population (2023)
  - Total: 10,430
  - Density: 87.54/km^{2} (226.7/sq mi)

Bilato is a district in Gorontalo Regency, Gorontalo Province, Indonesia. In 2023, this district had a population of 10,430 people with an area of 119.15 km².

== Governance ==
=== Villages ===
Administratively, Bilato District consists of 10 definitive villages (desa), namely:

Regional code	Name	Area (km²)	Population (2023)
75.01.23.2001	Totopo	14.00	856
75.01.23.2002	Bilato	10.58	1,236
75.01.23.2003	Ilomata	3.05	807
75.01.23.2004	Taula'a	24.22	983
75.01.23.2005	Juriya	4.51	694
75.01.23.2006	Pelehu	7.29	862
75.01.23.2007	Bumela	17.89	1,528
75.01.23.2008	Lamahu	26.46	1,725
75.01.23.2009	Musyawarah	3.82	459
75.01.23.2010	Suka Damai	7.57	1,280
	Totals	119.39	10,430
