= Indonesian hospital =

Indonesian hospital may refer to:

- Indonesia Hospital, a hospital in Gaza, Palestine
- Hospitals in Indonesia
