= Luluo =

Village in Biluhu, Gorontalo Regency, Gorontalo Province

- Village
- Interactive map of Luluo
- Location Luluo (Indonesia)
- Coordinates: 0°29′43.64″N 122°49′32.04″E
- Country: Indonesia
- Province: Gorontalo
- Regency: Gorontalo Regency
- District: Biluhu

Area
  - Total: 6.95 km^{2} (2.68 sq mi)

Population (2023)
  - Total: 640
  - Density: 92/km^{2} (240/sq mi)
- Time zone: UTC+8 (ICT)
- Regional code: 75.01.20.2004

Luluo is a village (desa) within the district of Biluhu, Gorontalo Regency, Gorontalo, Indonesia. As of 2023, it was inhabited by 640 people, and has the total area of 6.95 km^{2}.
