= 2025 Udayana University bullying incident =

Bullying incident related to a student's death in Indonesia

The 2025 Udayana University Bullying Incident
- Date: October 15, 2025; 11 months ago
- Venue: Udayana University
- Location: Denpasar, Bali, Indonesia
- Cause: Online harassment
- Target: Timothy Anugerah Saputra (deceased)
- Participants: See below
- Outcome: On-going investigations
- Deaths: 1
- Suspects: 11 (As per October 18, 2025)

The 2025 Udayana University bullying incident surrounded the death of student Timothy Anugerah Saputra and the subsequent public disclosure of a private group chat detailing harassment.

The incident occurred on the morning of October 15, 2025, when Timothy Anugerah Saputra, a student at Udayana University, was discovered with severe injuries near the main entrance of the Faculty of Social and Political Sciences (FISIP) building. He was reported to have fallen from the building's second floor and was immediately taken to the Prof. dr. I.G.N.G. Ngoerah General Hospital. Saputra later succumbed to the heavy injuries sustained in the fall.

Following his death, a private group chat involving several fellow Udayana University students was leaked and disseminated on social media. The messages within this chat contained content where fellow students were observed mocking and making light of the incident, alongside explicit instances of harassment specifically directed at Saputra.

The public disclosure of this group chat content resulted in widespread negative responses and strong public condemnation. The backlash was fueled by speculation that the documented online harassment may have been the main contributing factor that led Saputra to fall, suggesting his death was a result of self-harm related to the bullying. Local celebrities, politicians, and the general public condemned the bullying and severely criticized the university for its perceived slow and poor awareness in dealing with the serious issue that had come to light.

== List of Participants ==
Three students in Medical Major of 2021

- Calista Amore Manurung
- James Halim
- Erick Gonata

Five students in Political Science of 2023

- Alvitto Satriyaji
- Vito Simanungkalit
- Maria Victoria Viyata Mayos
- Anak Agung Ngurah Nanda
- Putu Ryan Abel Perdana Tirta

Two students in Marine and Fisheries of 2022

- Jetro Ferdio
- Leonardo Jonathan

== Aftermath and Investigations ==
=== Responses ===
On October 17, Udayana University began its official response to the incident. The Acting Vice Dean for Student Affairs and Information for the Faculty of Social and Political Sciences (FISIP), initially announced that the students involved in the leaked group chat were to receive academic sanctions. These sanctions included a reduction in their soft skill value, along with the requirement to submit a formal statement letter and record a video apology for clarification. Later, the university's Public Relations officer clarified that the group chat messages were sent after Saputra's death, not during the time the incident took place.

The university's initial response was poorly received, generating negative public reaction from people who felt the academic sanctions were insufficient and demanded that the perpetrators receive more fitting consequences.

The following day, October 18, the Governor of Bali, Koster, weighed in, stating that Udayana University must conduct a thorough investigation into the incident to accurately determine the cause of death.

On October 19, the Minister of Higher Education, Science and Technology, Yuliarto, expressed his shock and surprise regarding the incident. He subsequently contacted the Chancellor of Udayana University to seek an explanation and mandated that the university maintain continuous communication with Saputra's family regarding the tragedy. Furthermore, Minister Yuliarto requested that the campus administration ensure the university remains a comfortable and safe environment, entirely free from violence, including all forms of bullying.
