= Talumolo =

Kampong, or hamlet, in Dumbo Raya, Gorontalo, Indonesia

Coordinates: 0°31′N 123°04′E

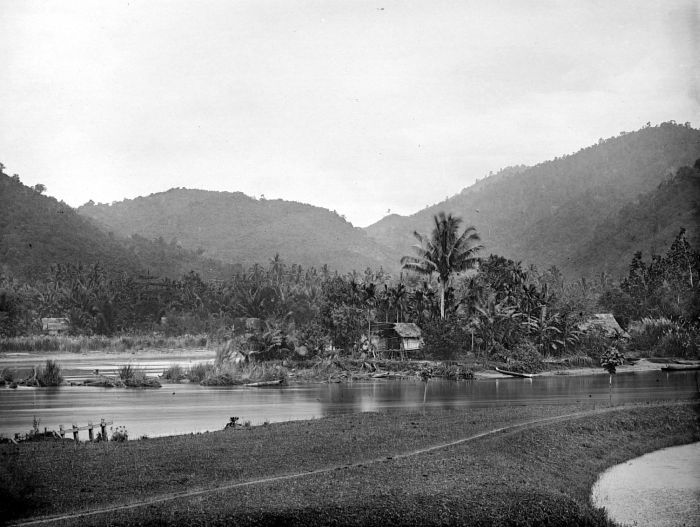
Talumolo, unknown year between 1900 and 1940

Talumolo is a kampong, or hamlet, in Dumbo Raya, a district of the city of Gorontalo, Gorontalo Province, Indonesia.
