= Biluhu =

- District
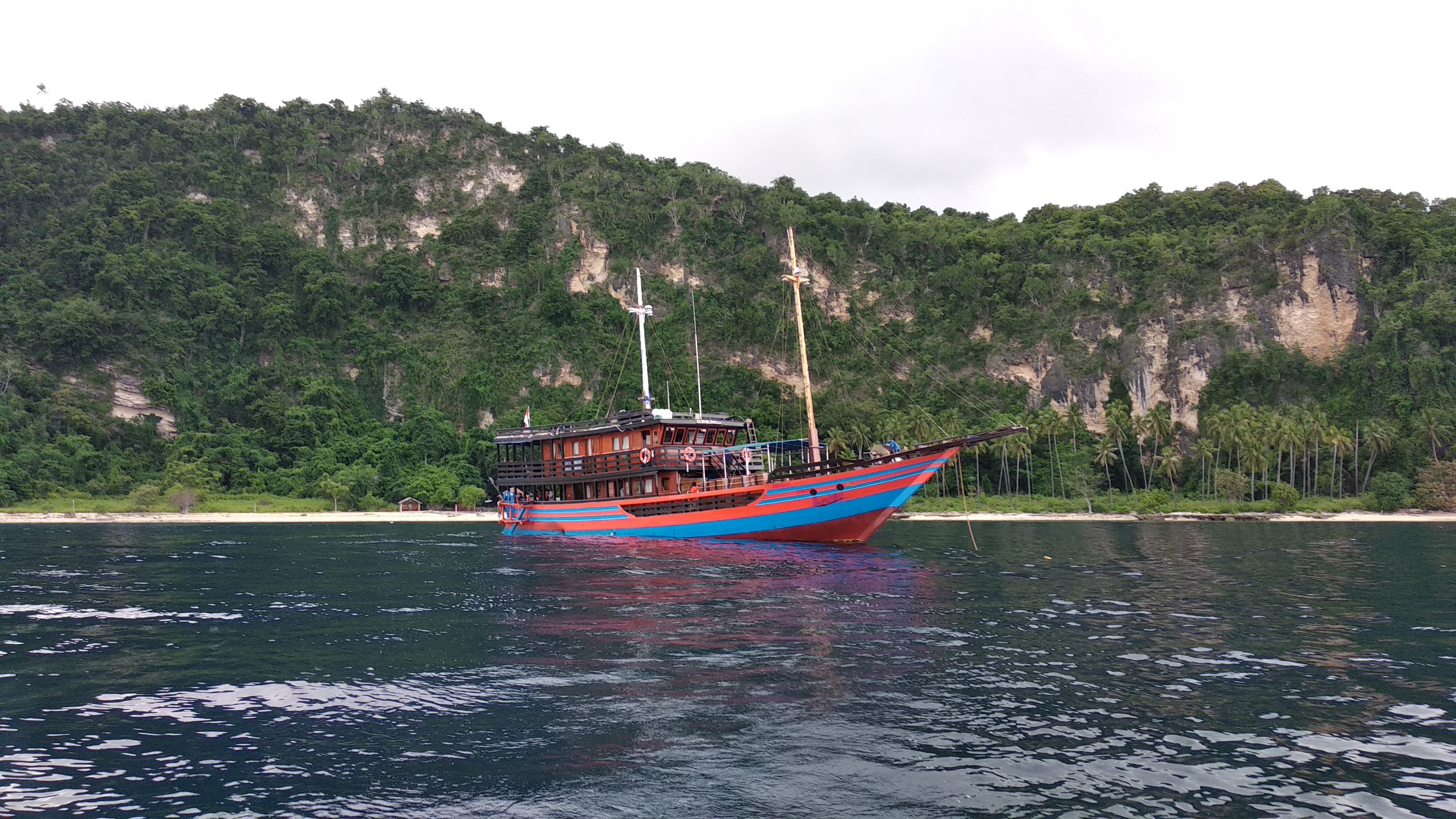
- Pinisi ship anchored in the waters off the coast of Biluhu
- Interactive map of Biluhu
- Location within Gorontalo Location within Sulawesi Location within Indonesia
- Coordinates: 0°29′55.6″N 122°49′40.4″E
- Country: Indonesia
- Province: Gorontalo
- Regency: Gorontalo Regency
- District seat: East Lobuto

Area
  - Total: 80.77 km^{2} (31.19 sq mi)

Population (2023)
  - Total: 8,693
  - Density: 107.6/km^{2} (278.8/sq mi)

Biluhu is a district in Gorontalo Regency, Gorontalo Province, Indonesia. In 2023, this district had a population of 8,693 people with an area of 80.77.

== Governance ==
=== Villages ===
Administratively, Biluhu District consists of 8 definitive villages (desa), namely:

Regional code	Name	Area (km²)	Population (2023)
75.01.20.2001	West Biluhu	17.96	1,627
75.01.20.2002	Lobuto	12.19	1,362
75.01.20.2003	Central Biluhu	12.23	1,627
75.01.20.2004	Luluo	6.95	640
75.01.20.2005	Huwongo	10.25	1,114
75.01.20.2006	East Lobuto	11.41	1,081
75.01.20.2007	Botu Boluo	3.93	720
75.01.20.2008	Olimeyala	5.84	522
	Totals	80.77	8,693
