= Aloei Saboe Hospital =

- Gorontalo City Government

Geography
- Location: Jl. Prof. Dr. H. Aloei Saboe No. 92, Wongkaditi 96122, Gorontalo, Gorontalo, Indonesia
- Coordinates: 0.556°N 123.084°E

Organisation
- Care system: Public
- Type: District General

Services
- Beds: 350

Links
- Website: rsas.gorontalokota.go.id
- Lists: Hospitals in Indonesia

Prof. Dr. dr. Aloei Saboe Regional General Hospital (Rumah Sakit Umum Daerah Prof. Dr. dr. Aloei Saboe, or Aloei Saboe Hospital) is the largest district general hospital in Gorontalo, Gorontalo, Indonesia. It is managed by the city government. In 2006, it was reported that the hospital was treating 500 diabetics in May 2006, most of them over 40 years of age, but at the time still had no doctor specializing in diabetes.
