= Bongomeme =

- District
- Interactive map of Bongomeme
- Location within Gorontalo Location within Sulawesi Location within Indonesia
- Coordinates: 0°36′0″N 122°51′58″E
- Country: Indonesia
- Province: Gorontalo
- Regency: Gorontalo Regency
- District seat: Dulamayo

Area
  - Total: 139.88 km^{2} (54.01 sq mi)

Population (2023)
  - Total: 20,665
  - Density: 147.73/km^{2} (382.63/sq mi)
- Time zone: UTC+08:00 (ICT)
- Postal code: 96246
- Regional code: 75.01.11
- Villages: 15

Bongomeme is a district in Gorontalo Regency, Gorontalo Province, Indonesia. In 2023, the total population of Bongomeme District was 20,665 consisting of 10,476 male residents and 10,189 female residents. The area that has the largest population is Upomela Village with a population percentage of 10.95%.

== Governance ==
=== Villages ===
Administratively, Bongomeme District consists of 15 definitive villages, namely:

Regional code	Village	Area (km²)	Population (2023)	Hamlets (dusun)	Elevation (m)
75.01.11.2001	Dulamayo	2.40	1,599	2	31
75.01.11.2008	Upomela	5.89	2,263	6	37
75.01.11.2009	Tohupo	11.94	2,150	5	53
75.01.11.2010	Molanihu	10.37	1,020	3	83
75.01.11.2011	Molopatodu	6.09	1,238	4	111
75.01.11.2012	Molas	9.16	1,603	4	228
75.01.11.2013	Batulayar	15.44	1,838	5	156
75.01.11.2014	Batu Loreng	10.13	1,255	4	71
75.01.11.2015	Bongohulawa	6.04	1,628	5	63
75.01.11.2016	Otopade	6.09	1,621	3	146
75.01.11.2018	Huntulohulawa	1.72	1,036	2	38
75.01.11.2022	Owalanga	3.01	913	3	140
75.01.11.2023	Liyodu	19.08	647	3	99
75.01.11.2024	Liyoto	16.70	825	3	154
75.01.11.2025	Kayumerah	13.45	1,029	4	194
	Totals	137.50	20,665	56	
