= Dharmais Hospital =

Dharmais Cancer Hospital
- Ministry of Health
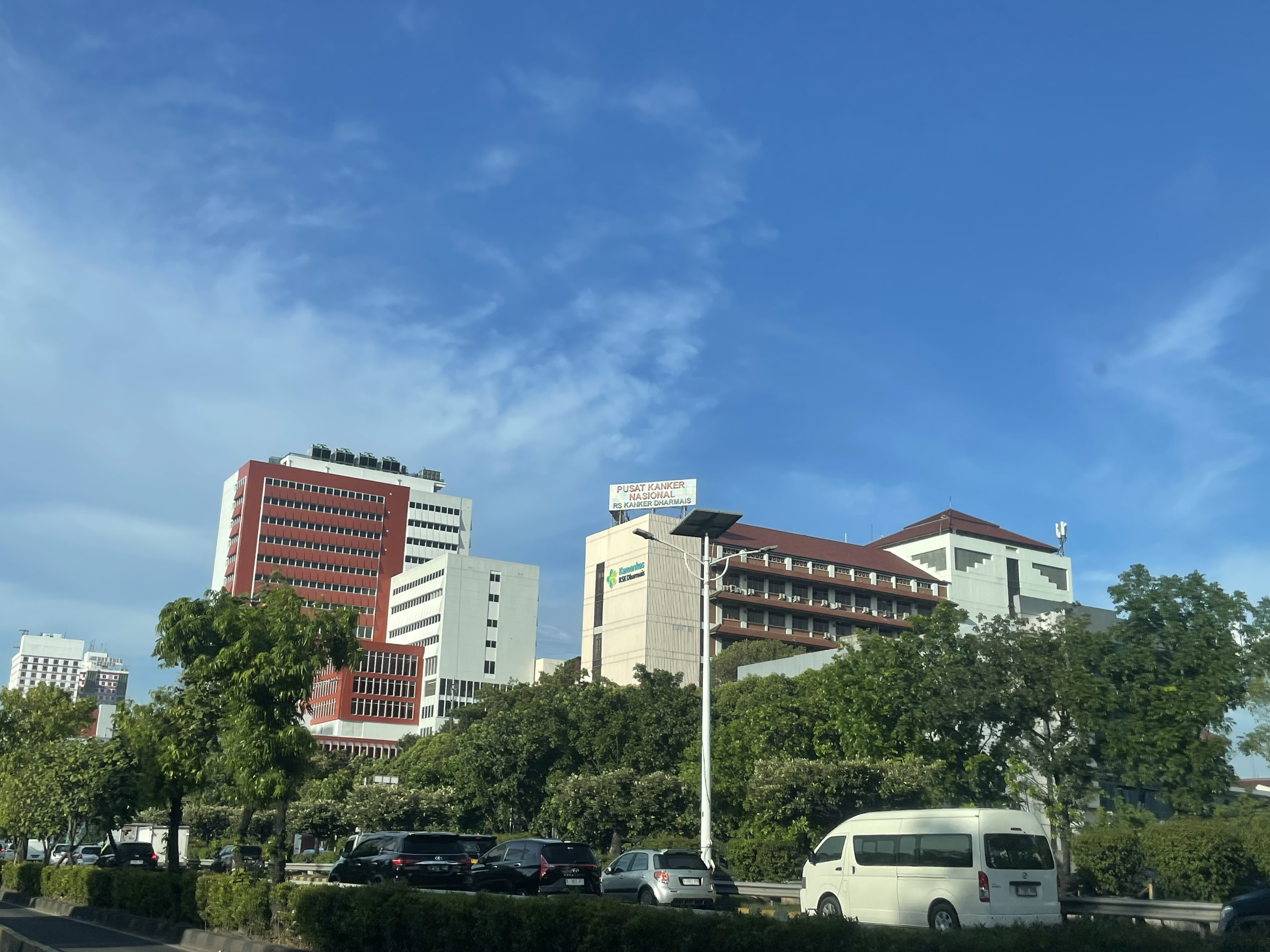
- Dharmais Cancer Hospital in 2024

Geography
- Location: Jalan Letjen Jend. S. Parman 84-86, West Jakarta, Jakarta, Indonesia
- Coordinates: 6.186663°S 106.797953°E

Organisation
- Type: Specialist

Services
- Speciality: Cancer

History
- Constructed: May 1991
- Opened: October 30, 1993; 32 years ago

Links
- Website: dharmais.co.id
- Lists: Hospitals in Indonesia

Dharmais Cancer Hospital (Indonesian: Rumah Sakit Kanker Dharmais) is a state-owned cancer hospital located in West Jakarta, Indonesia. This hospital is under the supervision of the Indonesian Ministry of Health. In 2017, it was affected by the WannaCry ransomware attack.

== History ==
Dharmais Hospital was founded during the New Order on the initiative of Tien Suharto, the first lady of the second Indonesian president Suharto, who felt called by the many cancer patients in Indonesia. In 1988, President Suharto, who is also the chairman of the Dharmais Foundation, asked Prof. Dr. dr. Arry Harryanto Reksodiputro, Sp.PD.KHOM, for the idea of a cancer hospital model that suits the needs of the community. Prof. Arry, together with members from the Faculty of Medicine of University of Indonesia and health experts, formed a timeframe for making the hospital proposal in October 1988. The proposal was finalized in December 1988 and submitted to the chairman of the Dharmais Foundation on January 9, 1989.

Construction of the hospital began in May 1991 and was completed on July 5, 1993. Dharmais Hospital was inaugurated by President Suharto on October 30, 1993.
