= Bethesda Hospital (Yogyakarta) =

- Yayasan Kristen untuk Kesehatan Umum
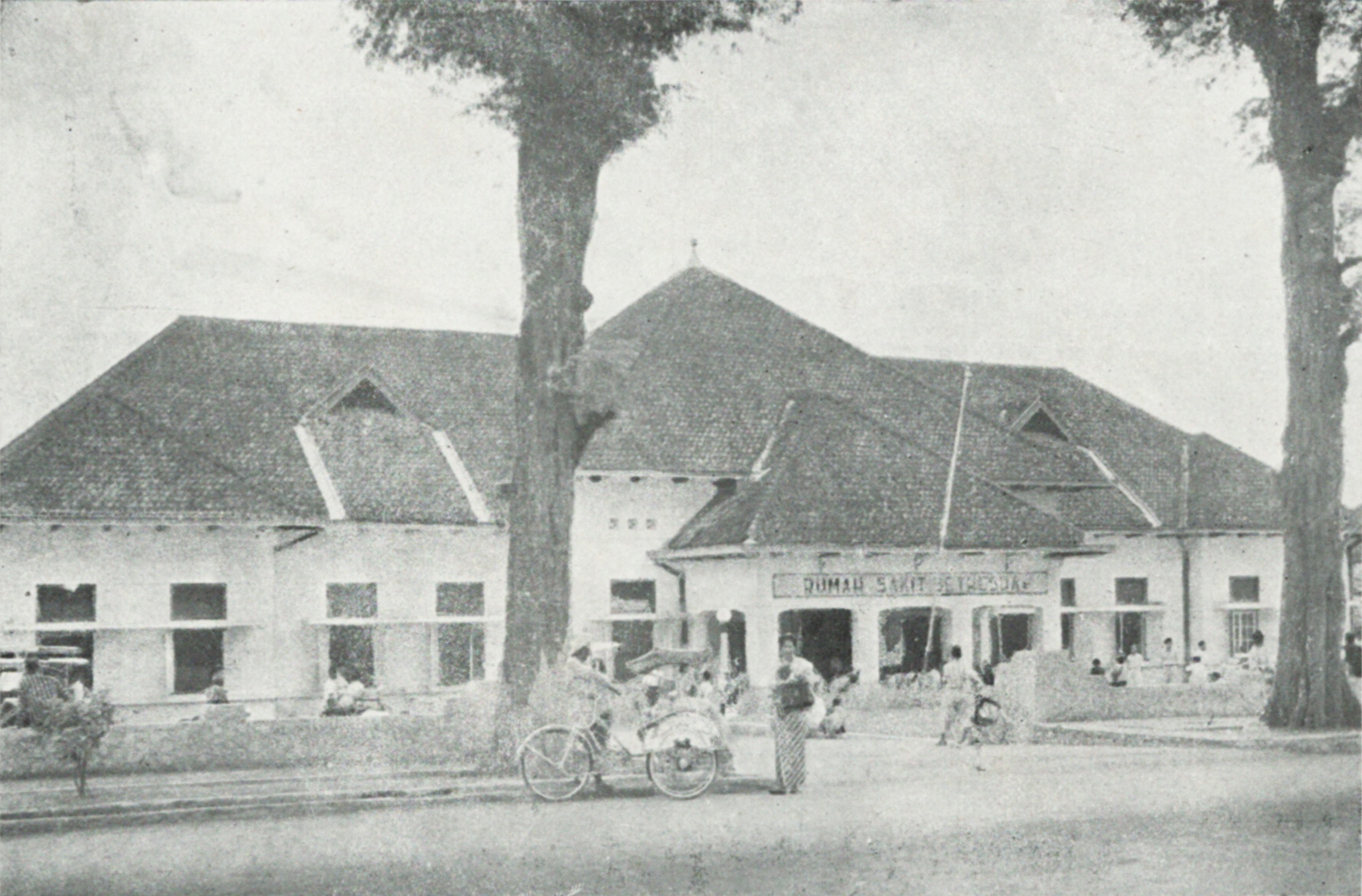
- Bethesda Hospital, circa 1956

- Location in Yogyakarta

Geography
- Location: Jl. Jenderal Sudirman No. 70, Yogyakarta, Special Region of Yogyakarta, Indonesia
- Coordinates: 7.783°S 110.378°E

Organisation
- Care system: Private
- Type: District General
- Religious affiliation: Protestantism

History
- Founded: 1899

Links
- Website: www.bethesda.or.id
- Lists: Hospitals in Indonesia

Bethesda Hospital (Rumah Sakit Bethesda), founded in 1899, is the oldest hospital in Yogyakarta, Indonesia. It is managed by Yayasan Kristen untuk Kesehatan Umum (Yakkum, lit. 'Christian Foundation for General Health').

== Name ==
The hospital has changed its name many times.

- Petronella Hospital (RS Toeloeng) (1899-1942)
- Yogyakarta Chūō Byoin (ジョクジャカルタ中央病院) (1942-1945)
- Rumah Sakit Umum Pusat (1945-1950)
- Rumah Sakit Bethesda (1950–present)

== History ==
=== Dr. J. G. Scheurer era (1899–1906) ===
The hospital was founded by Dr. J. G. Scheurer, who was Dutch, as Petronella hospital. He was the first person to found a hospital in Yogyakarta with the support from Sultan Hemengkubuwono VII. It was famous as RS Tulung, because its services were all free of charge.

=== Dr. H. S. Pruys era (1906–1918) ===
Dr. Pruys was the first person to introduce a referral system by building the hospital branches in the villages with Bethesda as the main hospital. The branches were also supported by Sultan Hamengkubuwono VII. The branches were located in Wates, Medari, Randugunting, Patalan, and Wonosari.

=== Dr. J. Offringa eraEra (1918–1930) ===
During Dr. Offringa's leadership, Petronella had a method reformation, especially admission office.

The building of the hospital branches was continued with the support from Yogyakarta Sultanate government, companies, factories, and banks.

Auto policlinic was established during this time.

=== Dr. K. P. Groot era (1930–1942) ===
During Dr. Groot's leadership, the hospital had many problems because of the world depression and World War II. Auto policlinics were stopped because they were too expensive. Nonetheless, in 1939 a sanatorium was opened in Pakem for treatment of tuberculosis.

=== Dr. L. G. J. Samallo Eerara (1942–1949) ===
Dr. Samallo was the first native hospital president. During his time the hospital was taken over by the Japanese. During this time the hospital name was changed to Yogyakarta Chūō Byoin.

During 1946 the hospital functioned as the office of The Health Ministry of Indonesia with Dr. Leimena as the health minister.

Finally, the hospital's name was changed into Bethesda Hospital.

=== Dr. Kasmolo Paulus era (1950–1958) ===
During this time, the hospital faced a hard time because of the situation of politics.

=== Dr. R.D. Reksodiwiryo era (1958–1964) ===
During this time the hospital was reformed.

=== Dr. Wardoyo era (1964–1972) ===
During Dr. Wardoyo's leadership, Indonesia faced economic recession.

=== Dr. Guno Samekto era (1973–1988) ===
Dr. Guno introduced the Without Wall Concept and Holistic Concept. During his leadership Bethesda Community Development and UPKM were founded.

=== Dr. R. Nugroho Hadi Purwowidagdo era (1989–2000) ===
During Dr. Nugroho's leadership the modern management principle and customer oriented principle were introduced.

=== Dr. Sugianto era (2000–) ===
During Dr. Sugianto's leadership the hospital system was computerized and was awarded by the President of Indonesia as the hospital with zero working accidents.

== Bethesda Community Development ==
CD Bethesda is a non-profit organization that functions as the outreach service unit of Bethesda Hospital, which is governed by YAKKUM (Yayasan Kristen untuk Kesehatan Umum—Christian Foundation for Public Health). YAKKUM is one of Indonesia's largest health service foundations.

CD Bethesda was founded in 1974 as a result of a YAKKUM planning meeting that mandated each of its hospital units to extend their comprehensive services through community development efforts in order to reach underserved populations.

== Presidents ==
1. Dr. J. Gerrit Scheurer (1899–1906)
2. Dr. H.S. Pruys (1906–1918)
3. Dr. J. Offringa (1918–1930)
4. Dr. K.P. Groot (1930–1942)
5. Dr. L.G.J. Samallo (1942–1949)
6. Dr. Kasmolo Paulus (1950–1958)
7. Dr. R.D. Reksodiwiryo (1958–1964)
8. Dr. Wardoyo (1964–1972)
9. Dr. Guno Samekto (1973–1988)
10. Dr. R. Nugroho Hadi Purwowidagdo (1989–2000)
11. Dr. Sugianto (2000–)
