= Pertamina Central Hospital =

Hospital in Jakarta, Indonesia

- Indonesia Healthcare Corporation

Geography
- Location: Kebayoran Baru, South Jakarta, Jakarta, Indonesia

Organisation
- Type: General

Links
- Website: www.rspp.co.id
- Lists: Hospitals in Indonesia

Pertamina Central Hospital (Indonesian: Rumah Sakit Pusat Pertamina, abbreviated as RSPP) is a state owned hospital located in Jakarta, Indonesia. It is one of the largest and best-equipped hospitals in the country, and was opened in January 1972 as a major project of the Suharto regime. It is managed by Pertamina Bina Medika (branded as Indonesia Healthcare Corporation), a subsidiary of the state-owned oil company Pertamina.
