= St Vincent de Paul Hospital =

St Vincent de Paul's Roman Catholic Hospital
- Arnoldus Foundation; Missionary Sisters Servants of the Holy Spirit

Geography
- Location: Jl. Diponegoro No. 51; Surabaya, 60241, Indonesia
- Coordinates: 7.2910°S 112.7362°E

Organisation
- Care system: BPJS Kesehatan
- Type: Teaching
- Affiliated university: St Vincent de Paul Catholic College of Health Sciences
- Patron: St. Vincent de Paul

Services
- Emergency department: Yes

History
- Former name: St. Vincentius a Paulo Roomsch Katholiek Ziekenhuis
- Founded: 3 May 1925; 100 years ago

Links
- Website: rkzsurabaya.com
- Lists: Hospitals in Indonesia

St Vincent de Paul's Hospital (Indonesian: Rumah Sakit Katolik St. Vincentius a Paulo), or popularly known by its acronym as RKZ (Dutch: St. Vincentius a Paulo Roomsch Katholiek Ziekenhuis, lit. 'St Vincent de Paul Roman Catholic Hospital'), is a large Catholic hospital in Surabaya, Indonesia. Administratively part of the Arnoldus Foundation, together with St Vincent de Paul Catholic College of Health Sciences, forms a part of the Holy Spirit Missionary Sisters legation in Indonesia.

== History ==
=== Early developments ===
Construction of St. Vincent de Paul Hospital started from the ideals and need to establish a Catholic Hospital in Surabaya which emerged in 1918. On 1 October 1919, Father Fleerackers SJ, who was voicing the development, signed an agreement to buy and sell two parcels of land in Reiniers Boulevard (now known as Jalan Diponegoro) by Soerabaja Roomsch Kerk en Armbestuur (Surabaya Church Management Body) and land owner R.P. Alpine Van. This sale and purchase agreement contains terms of the following:

"These parcels of land may only be used for the construction of hospitals and houses for the nuns. If within 3 months construction does not begin in earnest, then these parcels must be returned with the money without interest."

To support the realisation, on 9 September 1920 an association called "Roomsch Katholiek Ziekenhuis te Soerabaja Vereeneging" (RKZV) was formed. Due to ongoing political situation, it was difficult for RKZV to support the establishment of a Catholic Hospital, which prompt the land owner to made concessions by revising the agreement and softening its sanctions.

In 1923, the Jesuits Fathers were replaced by the Lazarists, which forced the development committee to be led by Father de Backere, CM.

=== First building ===
In 1924, the government closed all clinical practice in Surabaya. RKZV took advantage of the situation by renting a building to be created a hospital. The former clinic building of Dr. De Kock on 31 Jalan Oendaan Koelon with a capacity of 35 beds was chosen with the rental agreement signed on 1 January 1925. At that time, the RKZV was unsuccessful in inviting nuns who were willing to handle nursing duties at the hospital. Finally, the leadership of the Church through Mgr. Verstraelen, SVD from Flores who happened to be in Surabaya, contacted the leadership of the Holy Spirit Missionary Sisters in Steyl, the Netherlands to ask for assistance. The request was subsequently granted.

The Holy Spirit Missionary Sisters traveled for months by ship from the Netherlands to Batavia and arrived on 3 May 1925. From Batavia, the six sisters headed to Surabaya by express train and arrived at Surabaya Gubeng railway station and went straight to work the same day as there were already two patients in waiting. The six sisters are:

1. Sr. Jezualda, SSpS
2. Sr. Manetta, SSpS
3. Sr. Sponsaria, SSpS
4. Sr. Stephaniana, SSpS
5. Sr. Aldegonda, SSpS
6. Sr. Felicina, SSpS

3 May 1925 was determined as the founding date of St Vincent de Paul Catholic Hospital in Surabaya.

=== Transfer of responsibility ===
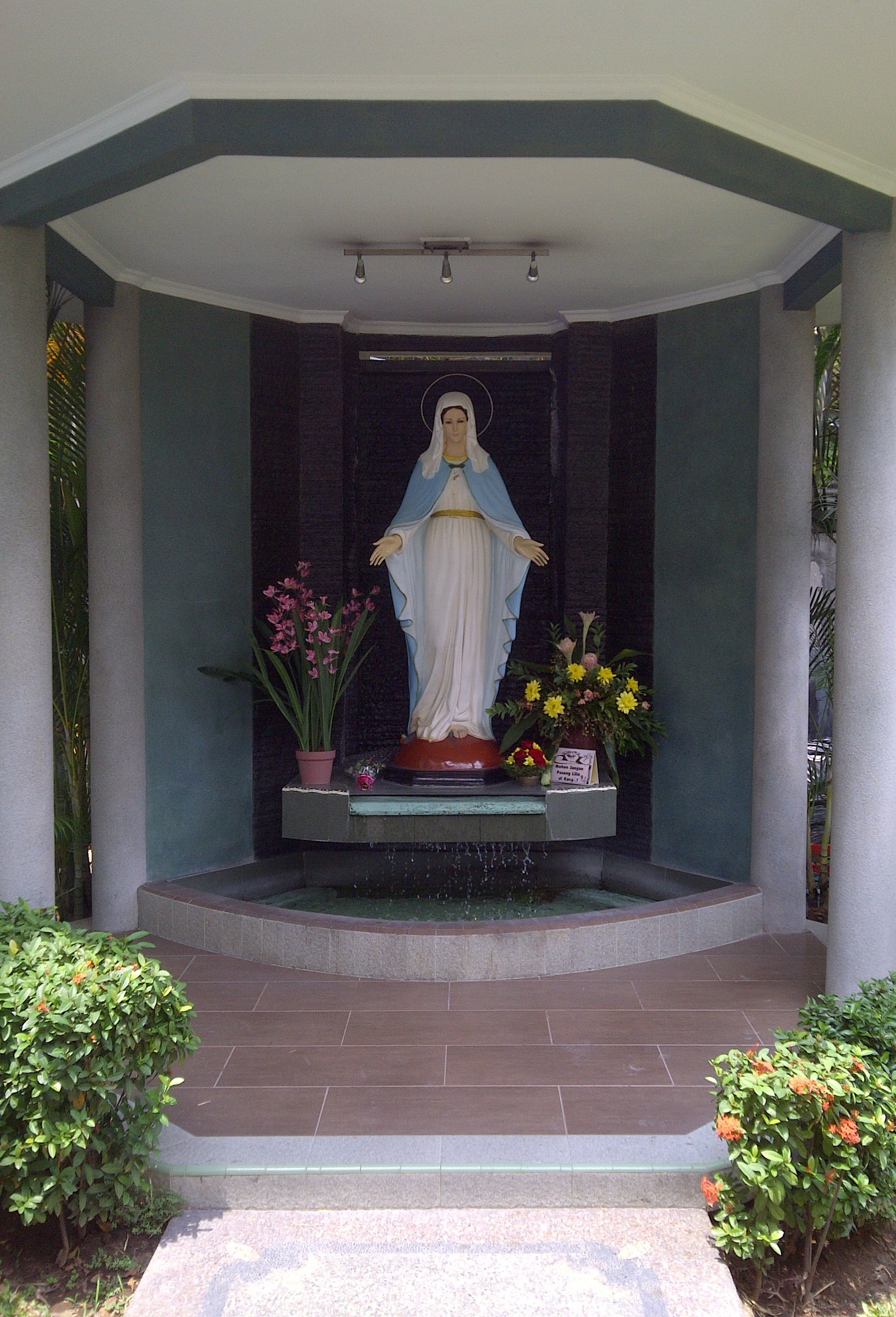
St. Mary's Grotto at St. Vincent de Paul Hospital

With the increasing need for health services in Surabaya, the building of the first hospital became increasingly inadequate. However, the RKZV experienced difficulties in managing the hospital, especially in its finance which therefore makes it difficult for the hospital to expand. The RKZV finally offered the Holy Spirit Missionary Sisters to continue their mission of establishing the hospital.

On 18 July 1933, the missionary sisters established the Arnoldus Foundation as the legal entity administering St. Vincent de Paul Hospital with Sr. Jezualda, SSpS, serving as chair, Sr. Nivita Linzt, SSpS, serving as Secretary, and Sr. Aldegonda, SSpS, serving as Treasurer. A patch of land was finally obtained at 136 Reiniers Boulevard (now Jl. Diponegoro 51) for the construction of a new hospital. The architectural firm Fermont-Cuypers created the plans, designed by the architects Theo Taen (1889-1970) and Thomas Nix (1904-1998). On 11 October 1933 at 16.00 the first stone for the construction of the new Catholic Hospital was laid down by Father Van Hall.

The construction of the new hospital was completed on 28 October 1934 and its opening was inaugurated by Msgr. Th. de Bachere, CM, and named St. Vincentius a Paulo Roomsch Katholiek Ziekenhuis (RKZ) with a capacity of 50 beds. In November 1934, patients at the old hospital building was transferred to the hospital in Reiniers Boulevard.

=== Japanese occupation ===
In 1942, Japanese troops entered Surabaya and took over the hospital, with the nuns taken as prisoner. At that time, St. Vincent de Paul Hospital capacity had reached 96 beds. After Japan surrendered, the hospital became a public hospital, but was finally returned to the Holy Spirit Missionary Sisters in 1948.

== Facilities ==
The current main pedestrian entrance is in Jalan Diponegoro, although there is a separate vehicle and A&E entrance in Jalan Ciliwung.

St Vincent de Paul Hospital has a 24-hour ambulance services as well as a medical rehabilitation centre. The hospital also hosts a Central Sterile Supply Department, Post-anesthesia care unit, laboratory and a pharmacy. A state of the art electroencephalography (EEG) and electromyography (EMG) unit also exist in the hospital. Pastoral care are also provided when necessary.

== Response to COVID-19 ==
In July 2021, St Vincent de Paul Hospital was overwhelmed with COVID-19 patient caused by the SARS-CoV-2 viruses. Alongside several other hospital in Surabaya, it stopped admitting COVID-19 patients on 2 July 2021 as it fears the healthcare system would collapsed if other non-COVID patients were not admitted due to overcapacity.

The hospital began re-admitting COVID-19 patients 4 days after the closure.
