= Potanga =

Village in Indonesia

Coordinates: 0°31′N 123°08′E

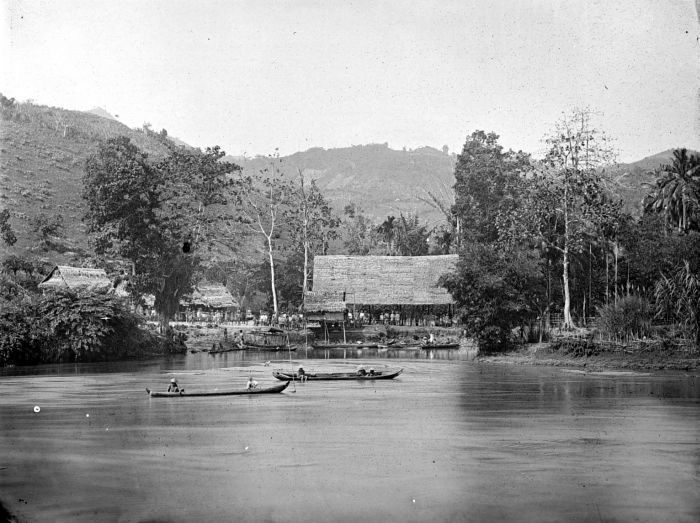
Potanga, Gorontalo, Sulawesi

Potanga is a village in Boliyohuto district, Gorontalo Regency, Gorontalo Province, Indonesia.
