= Dumbo Raya =

- Interactive map of Dumbo Raya
- Country: Indonesia
- Province: Gorontalo
- Regency: Gorontalo Regency
- City: Gorontalo

Dumbo Raya is a district in the city of Gorontalo, Indonesia.

== History ==
Dumbo Raya was established on 17 March 2011, after being split off from the southern part of Kota Timur district.

== Settlements ==
- Botu
- Bugis
- Leato Selatan
- Leato Utara
- Talumolo
