= State University of Gorontalo =

- Universitas Negeri Gorontalo
- Motto: Excellent and Competitive
- Type: State
- Established: September 1, 1963
- Rector: Dr. H. Eduart Wolok, ST, MT
- Academic staff: 10 Faculties
- Location: Gorontalo, Gorontalo, Indonesia; 0.556409°N 123.063605°E
- Campus: Urban
- Website: http://www.ung.ac.id/

State University of Gorontalo (UNG) is a state university in Gorontalo, Indonesia, that was established on 1 September 1963. At first the university was a junior college and part of Guidance and Counseling UNSULUTENG (Sulawesi Tengah). In 1964 its status changed to Guidance and Counseling Branch IKIP Yogyakarta at Manado. In 1965 it joined the Teachers Training College branch in Manado Gorontalo.

In 1982 the institution became one of the faculties of the Sam Ratulangi University Manado with the name of the Faculty of Teacher Training and Education (Guidance and Counseling) UNSRAT Manado, Gorontalo. The institute was officially established in 1993 under the name College of Teacher Training and Education (STKIP) Gorontalo.

In 2001 the institution was upgraded to State Teachers Training College Gorontalo with five faculties and 25 study programs. On June 23, 2004, President Megawati inaugurated and upgraded the status to State University of Gorontalo.

== Faculties ==
The university has tenth faculties and one school:

- Faculty of Education
- Faculty of Social Sciences
- Faculty of Mathematics and Natural Sciences
- Faculty of Literature and Culture
- Faculty of Engineering
- Faculty of Agriculture
- Faculty of Fishery and Marine Science
- Faculty of Health Sciences and Sports
- Faculty of Economics and Business
- Faculty of Law
- Graduate School
