= Prof. Ngoerah Hospital =

Prof. dr. I.G.N.G. Ngoerah Hospital
- Ministry of Health
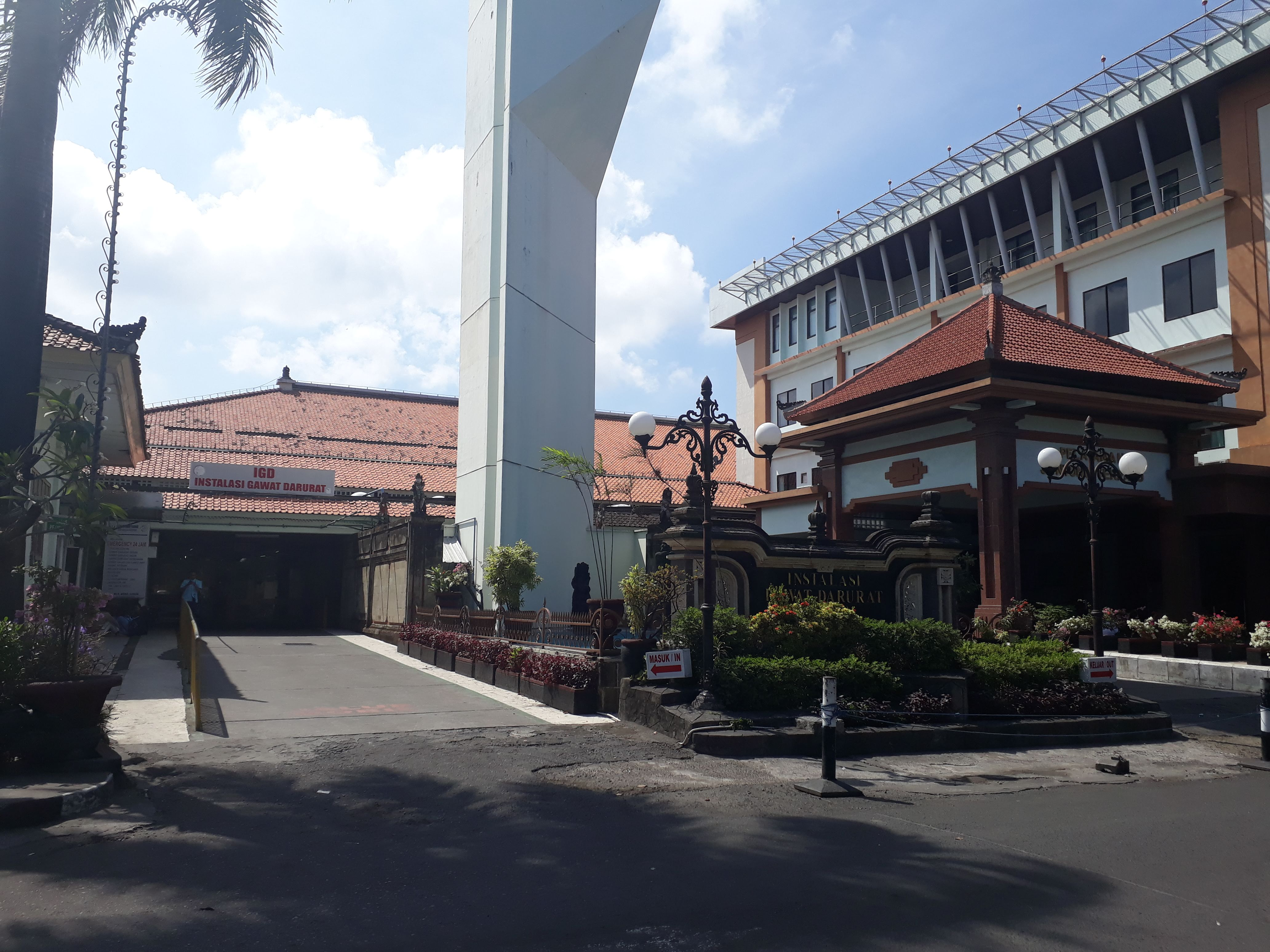
- Entrance to the emergency room

- Location within Indonesia

Geography
- Location: Jl. Diponegoro, No. 45, Denpasar, Bali, Indonesia
- Coordinates: 8.676°S 115.212°E

Organisation
- Care system: Public
- Type: Teaching, District General
- Affiliated university: Universitas Udayana
- Patron: I Goesti Ngoerah Gde Ngoerah

Services
- Emergency department: Yes
- Beds: 738

History
- Founded: 30 December 1959; 66 years ago

Links
- Website: https://profngoerahhospitalbali.com
- Lists: Hospitals in Indonesia

Prof. dr. I.G.N.G. Ngoerah Central General Hospital (Indonesian: Rumah Sakit Umum Pusat Prof. dr. I.G.N.G. Ngoerah, or Prof. Ngoerah Hospital) is the largest district general hospital in Bali. The hospital was known as Sanglah General Hospital (Indonesian: Rumah Sakit Umum Pusat Sanglah) until 2022. Many of the victims of the 2002 Bali bombings were treated there. The new name is a tribute to I Goesti Ngoerah Gde Ngoerah.

== History ==
The hospital building work began in 1955, and the hospital was officially opened by President Sukarno on 30 December 1959. In 1962, it started offering medical training in cooperation with the medical faculty of Udayana University. In 1978, it became the referral teaching hospital for the provinces of Bali, East Nusa Tenggara, West Nusa Tenggara and East Timor. In 2005, it became a regional government public service institution (BLUD), and was designated a Class A teaching hospital. On 7 July 2022, the name was officially changed to the Prof. Dr. I.G.N.G. Ngoerah Central Provincial General Hospital.

== Facilities ==
The hospital has a total of 738 beds, and over 500 doctors and more than a thousand nurses on the staff. The hospital has a hyperbaric chamber, radiotherapy facilities and offers radiology and diagnostic imaging services. It also has an integrated cancer therapy unit, intensive care facilities and a burns unit. and carries out kidney transplants and in vitro fertilisation. It provides general checkups, has an HIV therapy center and also conducts research and development. Also on the hospital grounds are a pharmacy, shops and a bank.
