= List of hospitals in Indonesia =

List articles on notable hospitals in Indonesia

This is a list of hospitals in Indonesia, including clinics. As of 2019, there were 2,813 hospitals of all types in Indonesia, 63.5% of which are run by private organisations. In 2012, according to data from the Ministry of Health of Indonesia, there were 2,454 hospitals around the country, with a total of 305,242 beds, a figure of 0.9 bed per 1,000 inhabitants. According to the World Health Organization, there were 5,734 hospitals with 338,370 beds in 2014. Most hospitals are in urban areas. In 2014, 53 percent of the hospitals were in the Java-Bali region were 59 percent of the population lived.

== Medical centers ==
Current Medical Centers in Indonesia
Name	Street Address	Province	Beds, References
Bali International Medical Centre	Jalan By Pass Ngurah Rai No.100X, Kuta	Bali	
Bio Medi Centre	JI. MH Thamrin Blok B17, Ruko, Union-Lippo Cikarang, Bekasi	West Java	
Bintaro International Hospital	Jl. MH, Thamrin Blok B3/1, Sector VII- Bintaro Jaya, Tangerang	West Java	
Klinik Utama Bunga Emas	Jl. Melati No.1, Dangin Puri, Kec. Denpasar Tim., Kota Denpasar	Bali	-
Merdeka Medical Centre (MMC)	JI. Merdeka VIII, 2 Tanjung Bungkak, Denpasar	Bali	

== Hospitals ==
Current Medical Centers in Indonesia
Name	Street Address	City	Province	Beds, References
RS Aloei Saboe	Jl. Prof. Dr. H. Aloei Saboe No. 92	Wongkaditi	Gorontalo	350
RS Bethesda	JI. Jendral Sudirman No 70	Yogyakarta	Special Region of Yogyakarta	
Primaya Hospital Tangerang	Jl. MH. Thamrin no. 3, Kebon Nanas Cikokol Tangerang	Tangerang	Banten	
Primaya Hospital Bekasi Barat	Jl. KH. Noer Ali No.Kav. 17-18, RT.001/RW.009, Kayuringin Jaya, Kec. Bekasi Selatan., Kota Bekasi, Jawa Barat 17144	Bekasi	West Java	
Primaya Hospital Bekasi Timur	Jl. H.M. Joyomartono, RT.03/RW.21, Margahayu Bekasi Timur	Bekasi	West Java	
Primaya Hospital Bekasi Utara	Jl. Kaliabang Villa Indah Permai (Golden City) Blok G No.1 Teluk Pucung Bekasi Utara	Bekasi	West Java	
Primaya Hospital PGI Cikini	Jl. Raden Saleh Raya No.40, RT.12/RW.2,	Daerah Khusus Ibukota	Jakarta	331
RS Umum Pusat Nasional (Dr. Cipto Mangunkusumo Hospital)	Jl. Diponegoro No.71	Salemba	Jakarta	1,001
RS Kanker Dharmais	JI. S. Parman Kav 84-86	Slipi, West Jakarta	Special Capital Region of Jakarta	
RS Pusat Angkatan Darat Gatot Soebroto (Army Hospital)	Jl. Abdul Rahman Saleh 24	Senen, Central Jakarta	Special Capital Region of Jakarta	
RSAB Harapan Kita	JI. Letjen S Parman Kav 87	Slipi, West Jakarta	Special Capital Region of Jakarta	
RS Umum Pusat (Dr. Kariadi)	Jl. DR. Sutomo 16	Semarang	Central Java	
RS Panti Rapih	JI. Cik Ditiro No 30	Yogyakarta	Special Region of Yogyakarta	
Prof. dr. I.G.N.G. Ngoerah General Hospital	JI. Diponegoro	Denpasar	Bali	
RS Siloam Gleneagles Hospital	Jl. Siloam 6		West Java	
RS Siloam Cikarang	JI. MH. Thamrin Kav 105	Bekasi	West Java	
RS Abdi Waluyo	Jl. HOS. Cokrominoto 33, Menteng	Central Jakarta	Special Capital Region of Jakarta	
RS Advent Bandar Lampung	JI. Teuku Umar No 48		Lampung	
RS Advent Bandung	JI. Cihampelas No 161	Bandung	West Java	
RS Advent Medan	JI. Gatot Subroto KM 4	Medan - Binjai	North Sumatra	
RS Agung Manggarai	JI. Sultan Agung No 67	Manggarai, South Jakarta	Special Capital Region of Jakarta	
RS Al Islam Bandung	JI. Sukamo Hatta No 644	Bandung	West Java	
RS Ananda Bekasi	JI. Sultan Agung No 173	Bekasi West	West Java	
RS Annisa Bekasi	Cikarang Baru No 31	Lemah Abang, Bekasi	West Java	
RS Anwar Medika	Semawut Balongbendo	Sidoarjo	East Java	
RS Atmajaya	JI. Pluit Raya No 2	North Jakarta	Special Capital Region of Jakarta	
RS Awal Bros	JI. Jend Sudirman No 117	Pekanbaru	Riau	
RS Azra Bogor	JI. Raya Pajajaran	Bogor	West Java	
RS Balikpapan Baru	JI. MT. Haryono, Blok A-3A No 7-9, Komp	Balikpapan Baru	East Kalimantan	
RS Baptist Kediri	Kotak Pos 1, JI Brigjen Pol lBH Pranoto	Kediri (city)	East Java	
RS Bayukarta Karawang	JI. Kertabumi No 44	Karawang	Karawang Regency, West Java	
RS Bhakti Husada Cikarang	JI. Re Martadinata	Cikarang, Bekasi	West Java	
RS Bhakti Kartini	JI. Kartini No 11	Bekasi	West Java	
RS Bhakti Yudha Depok	JI. Raya Sawangan	Depok	West Java	
RS Bhayangkara Andi Mappa, Oudang	JI. Letjen Pol Andi Mappa, Oudang No 63	Makassar	South Sulawesi	
RS Bhineka Bakti Husada	JI. Cabe Raya No 17, Pondok Cabe	Ciputat, South Jakarta	Special Capital Region of Jakarta	
RS Bina Husada	JI. May, Oking Jajaatmaja, Cibinong	Bogor	West Java	
RS Budi Kemuliaan Batam	JL. Budi Kemuliaan No 1	Batam	Riau Islands	
RS Budi Lestari	JI. KH Noer Alie No 2, Depan Perumnas	Bekasi	West Java	
RS Budi Mulia	JI. Raya Gubeng No 70	Surabaya	East Java	
RS Bunda Jakarta	JI. Teuku Cik Ditiro No 28, Menteng	Central Jakarta	Special Capital Region of Jakarta	
RS Bunda Purwokerto	JI. Pramuka 249	Purwokerto	Banyumas Regency	
RS Darmo Surabaya	JI. Raya Darrno 90	Surabaya	East Java	
RS Delta Surya	JI. Pahlawan No 9	Sidoarjo	East Java	
RS Dewi Maya	JI. Surakarta No 2	Medan	North Sumatra	
RS Dewi Sri Karawang	JI. Arief Rahman Hakim No 1A	Karawang	Karawang Regency, West Java	
RS Dharma Nugraha	JI. Balai Pustaka Baru No 19	Rawamangun	East Jakarta	
RS Dirgahayu Samarinda	Jl. Gunung Merbabu No 40	Samarinda	East Kalimantan	
RS Raden Mattaher Jambi	JI. Rd. Mattaher No. 33	Jambi(City)	Jambi	
RS Dr. Oen Solo Baru	Komp. Perumahan Solo Baru, Kec.Grogol	Sukoharjo Regency	Central Java	
RS Dr. Oen Surakarta	JI. Brigjen Katamso No 55	Surakarta, Solo	Central Java	
RS Dr. Soetomo	Jl. Mayjen Prof. Dr. Moestopo No.6-8	Surabaya	East Java	
RS Dr. Wahidin Sudirohusodo	JI. Perintis Kemerdekaan Km 11, Tamalanrea	Makassar	South Sulawesi	
RS Fatmawati	JI. RS Fatmawati	Cilandak, South Jakarta	Special Capital Region of Jakarta	
RS Gandaria	JI. Gandaria Tengah 11/6	Kebayoran Baru, South Jakarta	Special Capital Region of Jakarta	
RS Gatoel Mojokerto	Jl. R. Wijaya 56	Mojokerto	East Java	
RS Gleneagles Medan	6 Jalan Listrik No. 6	Medan	North Sumatra	
RS Graha Juanda	JI. Ir. H. Juanda No. 326	Bekasi	West Java	
RS Graha Medika	JI. Raya Pejuangan	Kebon Jeruk, West Jakarta	Special Capital Region of Jakarta	
RS Haji Jakarta	JI. Raya Pondok Gede	East Jakarta	Special Capital Region of Jakarta	
RS Haji Medan	JI. RS Haji Medan Estate	Medan	North Sumatra	
RS Harapan Bunda Batam	Jl. Seraya 1	Batam	Riau Islands	
RS Harapan Bunda Jakarta	JI. Raya Bogor Km 22	East Jakarta	Special Capital Region of Jakarta	
RS Harapan Depok	JI. Pemuda No 10	Depok	West Java	
RS Harapan Magelang	JI. P Senopati No11	Magelang Regency	Central Java	
RS Honoris Hospital	Jl. Honoris Raya Kav. 6, Kota Modern, Kodya Dati II	Tangerang	Banten	
RS Horas Insani	JI. Medan Km 2, 5 Pematang Siantar	Medan	North Sumatra	
RS Husada	JI. Mangga Besar No 137-139	Central Jakarta	Special Capital Region of Jakarta	
RS Immanuel Bandung	JI. Kopo No 161	Bandung	West Java	
RS Immanuel Way Halim	JI. Soekamo-Hatta, Tromol Pos I	Bandar (City)	Lampung	
RS International Bintaro	JI. MH Thamrin Blok B3 No 1, Sektor 7	Bintaro Jaya, South Tangerang	Jakarta metropolitan area	
RS Islam Aisyiyah	JI. Sulawesi 16	Malang	East Java	
RS Islam Assyifa Sukabumi	Jl. Jend Sudirman No 27	Sukabumi	West Java	
RS Islam Banjarmasin	JI. Letjend S. Parman, Gg. Purnama No1	Banjarmasin	South Kalimantan	
RS Islam Bogor	JI. Perdana Raya No 22	Bogor	West Java	
RS Islam Faisal	Jl. A. Pangerang Pettarani	Makassar	South Sulawesi	
RS Islam Fatimah Banyuwangi	JI. Jember No.25	Kabat- Banyuwangi (town)	Banyuwangi Regency	
RS Islam Jakarta Cempaka Putih	JI. Cempaka Putih, Tengah 111	Central Jakarta	Special Capital Region of Jakarta	
RS Islam Jakarta Timur	Jl. Raya Pondok Kopi	East Jakarta	Special Capital Region of Jakarta	
RS Islam Jakarta Utara	JI. Tipar, Cakung No 5	North Jakarta	Special Capital Region of Jakarta	
RS Islam Klaten	JI. Raya Yogya Solo Km 2	Klaten	Central Java	
RS Islam Samarinda	JI. Gurame No 18	Samarinda	East Kalimantan	
RS Islam Siti Hadjar	Jl. Raden Patah 70-72	Sidoarjo	East Java	
RS Islam Siti Khadijah	JI. Demang Lebar Daun, Pakjo	Padang	South Sumatra	
RS Islam Sultan Agung	JI. Raya Kaligawe Km 4	Semarang	Central Java	
RS Islam Surabaya	Jl. Achmad Yani 2-4	Surabaya	East Java	
RS Islam Surakarta	JI. Jend A Yani Pabelan	Surakarta	Central Java	
RS Islam Wonosobo	JI. Mayjen Bambang Sugeng, Km 3, Mendolo	Wonosobo	Central Java	
RS Jakarta	JI. Jend Sudirman Kav 49	South Jakarta	Special Capital Region of Jakarta	
RS Jasa Kartini	JI. Sarianingrat No 2	Tasikmalaya	West Java	
RS Kanker Dharmais	JI. S. Parman Kav 84-86	Slipi, West Jakarta	Special Capital Region of Jakarta	
RS Karya Bhakti	JI. Dr. Sumeru No 120	Bogor	West Java	
RS Karya Husada	JI. Jend. A. Yani No 98	Cikampek	Karawang Regency	
RS Karya Medika	JI. Raya Cibitung, Desa Kalijaya, Cibitung	Bekasi	West Java	
RS Kasih Ibu Bali	JI. Teuku Umar 120	Denpasar	Bali	
RS Kasih Ibu Surakarta	JI. Slamet Riyadi 404	Surakarta	Solo	
RS Katolik Vincentius a Paulo (RKZ)	JI. Diponegoro 51	Surabaya	East Java	
RS Kebon Jati	JI. Kebon Jati	Bandung	West Java	
RS Keluarga Afia	JI. Kali Pasir No 9, Cikini	Central Jakarta	Special Capital Region of Jakarta	
RS Khusus THT Bedah Proklamasi	JI. Proklamasi 43	Central Jakarta	Special Capital Region of Jakarta	
RS Krakatau Steel Cilegon	JI. Semang Raya	Cilegon	Banten	
RS Kramat 128	JI. Kramat Raya No 128	Central Jakarta	Special Capital Region of Jakarta	
RS Labuang Baji	JI. Ratulangi No 81	Somba Opu, Makassar	South Sulawesi	
RS Ludira Husada Tama	JI. Wiratama No 4, Tegalrejo	Yogyakarta	Special Region of Yogyakarta	
RS Manu Husada Malang	JI. Sultan Agung No 12	Malang	East Java	
RS Mardi Rahayu Kudus	JI. R. Agil Kusumadiya No 110	Kudus	Kudus Regency	
RS Marinir Cilandak	JI. Cilandak KKO	South Jakarta	Special Capital Region of Jakarta	
RS Marsudi Waluyo Singosari	JI. Raya Mondoroko Km 9	Malang	East Java	
RS Materna Medan	JI. Teuku Umar No 9 -11	Medan	North Sumatra	
RS Mayapada Tangerang	Jl. Honoris Raya No.6	Tangerang	Banten	
RS Mayapada Surabaya	Jl. Mayjen Sungkono No.20	Surabaya	East Java	
RS Medika Cikarang	JI. Ry Ind Pasirgombong, Jababeka-Cikarang	Bekasi	West Java	
RS Medika Galaxi	JI. Gardenia Raya Selatan, Blok BA 1 no. 11 Villa	South Bekasi	West Java	
RS Medika Permata Hijau	JI. Raya Kebayoran Lama, No.64	West Jakarta	Special Capital Region of Jakarta	
RS Mediros	JI. Perintis Kemerdekaan Kav 149	East Jakarta	Special Capital Region of Jakarta	
RS Medistra	JI. Gatot Subroto Kav 59	South Jakarta	Special Capital Region of Jakarta	
RS Mekar Sari	JI. Mekar Sari No 1	Bekasi East	West Java	
RS Methodist Medan	JI. MH Thamrin Medan 105	Medan	North Sumatra	
RS MH Thamrin Cengkareng	JI. Daan Mogot Km 17	Cengkareng, West Jakarta	Special Capital Region of Jakarta	
RS MH Thamrin Cileungsi	JI. Raya Narogong KM 16, Limus, Nunggal, Cileungsi	Bogor	West Java	
RS MH Thamrin International, Salemba	JI. Salemba Tengah 26-28	Central Jakarta	Special Capital Region of Jakarta	
RS MH Thamrin Pondok Gede	JI. Raya Pondok Gede No 23-25	East Jakarta	Special Capital Region of Jakarta	
RS Mitra Internasional	JI. Raya Jatinegara Timur, No.85-87	East Jakarta	Special Capital Region of Jakarta	
RS Mitra Kasih	JI. Raya Cibabat No 341	Cimahi	Bandung Metropolitan Area	
RS Mitra Keluarga Bekasi	JI. Jend Ahmad Yani	Bekasi	West Java	
RS Mitra Kemayoran	JI. Landasan Pacu Timur	Kemayoran, North Jakarta	Special Capital Region of Jakarta	
RS Mitra Keluarga Surabaya	Jl. Satelit Indah II Blok FN No.8	Surabaya	East Java	
RS Mitra Keluarga Waru	Jl. Jenderal S. Parman No.8	Sidoarjo	East Java	
RS Muhammadiyah Bandung	JI. KH. Ahmad Dahlan No 53	Bandung	West Java	
RS Ngesti Waluyo Parakan, Temanggung	JI. Parakan		Temanggung Regency	
RS Nirmala Suri	JI. Raya Solo Sukoharjo Km 9	Sukoharjo Regency	Central Java	
RS Omni Medical Center	Jl. Puiomas Barat VI	East Jakarta	Special Capital Region of Jakarta	
RS Pancaran Kasih	JI. Sam Ratulangi XIII	Manado	North Sulawesi	
RS Pantai Indah Kapuk	JI. Pantai Indah Utara	Pluit, North Jakarta	Special Capital Region of Jakarta	
RS Panti Nirmala	JI. Kebalen Wetan No 8	Malang	East Java	
RS Panti Nugroho	JI. Kaliurang Km 17	Pakem, Yogyakarta	Special Region of Yogyakarta	
RS Panti Rapih	JI. Cik Ditiro No 30	Yogyakarta	Special Region of Yogyakarta	
RS Panti Rini	JI. Solo Km 12, 5 Kalasan	Yogyakarta	Special Region of Yogyakarta	
RS Panti Waluya awahan/RKZ, Malang	JI. Nusa Kambangan 56	Malang	East Java	
RS Panti Wilasa Semarang	JI. Dr. Cipto No 50	Semarang	Central Java	
RS Pasar Minggu	Jl. Raya Ragunan P7	Pasar Minggu, South Jakarta	Special Capital Region of Jakarta	
RS Pelabuhan Cirebon	JI. Sisingamangaraja No 45	Cirebon	West Java	
RS Pelabuhan Surabaya	JI. Kalianget No 1 - 2	Pabean Cantian, Surabaya	East Java	
RS Pelni Petamburan	JL AlP II KS Tubun 92-94	West Jakarta	Special Capital Region of Jakarta	
RS Permata Bunda	JI. Sisingamangaraja No 7	Medan	North Sumatra	
RS Persahabatan	Jl. Persahabatan Raya	Rawamangun	East Jakarta	
RS Pertamina Balikpapan	JI. Jend Sudirman No.1	Balikpapan	East Kalimantan	
RS Pertamina Jaya	JI. Jend A Yani No 2, By Pass	Central Jakarta	Special Capital Region of Jakarta	
RS Pertamina Klayan Cirebon	JI. Patra Raya Klayan	Cirebon	West Java	
RS Pertamina Prabumulih	JI. Kesehatan No 100	Komperta	Prabumulih	
RS Pertimina Cilacap	JI. Setiabudi, Tegal kamulyan	Cilacap Regency	Central Java	
RS Pertimina Tanjung	JI. Gas Murung Pudak	Tanjung	South Kalimantan	
RS PGI Cikini	JI. Raden Saleh No 40	Central Jakarta	Special Capital Region of Jakarta	
RS PKU Muhammadiyah, Yogyakarta	JI. KH Ahmad Dahlan No 20	Yogyakarta	Special Region of Yogyakarta	
RS Pluit	JI. Raya Pluit Selatan No 2	North Jakarta	Special Capital Region of Jakarta	
RS PMI Bogor	JI. Raya Pajajaran, P.O. Box 59	Bogor	West Java	
RS Pondok Indah	JI. Metro Duta Kav UE	Pondok Indah, South Jakarta	Special Capital Region of Jakarta	
RS Prikasih	JI. RS Fatmawati No 74	Pondok Labu, South Jakarta	Special Capital Region of Jakarta	
RS Premier Surabaya	Jl. Nginden Intan Barat Blok B	Surabaya	East Java	
RS Prima Medika	JI. P. Serangan No.9X	Denpasar	Bali	
RS Puri Cinere	JI. Maribaya Blok F2	Cinere-Sawangan, Depok	West Java	
RS Puri Medika	Jl. Sungai Bambu Raya 5	Tanjung Priok, North Jakarta	Special Capital Region of Jakarta	
RS Pusat Pertamina	JI. Kyai Maja No 43	Kebayoran Baru, South Jakarta	Special Capital Region of Jakarta	
RS QAOR	Komp. Islamic Village, P.O. Box 492, Desa Kelapa Dua	Tangerang	Banten	
RS R.K. Charitas	JI. Jend Sudirman No 1054	Padang	West Sumatra	
RS Ratna Husada	JI. Pramuka No 12 Narogong	Bekasi East	West Java	
RS Restu Ibu Balikpapan	JI. A. Yani No.6	Balikpapan	East Kalimantan	
RS Restu Ibu Padang	JI. Proklamasi No 37	Padang	West Sumatra	
RS Roemani Muhammadiyah	JI. Wonodri No 22	Semarang	Central Java	
RS Sanglah Denpasar	JI. Diponegoro	Denpasar	Bali	
RS Santa Elisabeth Medan	JI. H. Misbah No 7	Medan	North Sumatra	
RS Santo Boromeus	JI. Ir. H Juanda, No 100	Bandung	West Java	
RS Sari Asih	JI. Imam Bonjol No 38	Karawaci, Tangerang	Banten	
RS Sari Mulia Banjarmasin	JI. P. Antasari No.139	Banjarmasin	South Kalimantan	
RS Sari Mutiara	JI. Kapten Muslim No 79	Medan	North Sumatra	
RS Selaguri Padang	JI. Jend Ahmad Yani No 26	Padang	West Sumatra	
RS Selasih Padang	JI. Khatib Sulaiman No 72	Padang	West Sumatra	
RS Sentra Medika Cimanggis	JI. Raya Bogor Km 33	Cisalak, Depok	West Java	
RS Seta Hasbadi	JI. Raya Seroja No 19, Harapan Jaya	Bekasi	West Java	
RS Setia Mitra	JI. RS Fatmawati No 80-82	South Jakarta	Special Capital Region of Jakarta	
RS Siaga Raya	JI. Siaga Raya Kav 4-8, Pejaten Barat Ps Minggu	South Jakarta	Special Capital Region of Jakarta	
RS Siloam Cikarang	Lippo Cikarang	Bekasi	West Java	
RS Siloam Hospitals Agora	Jl. Letjen Suprapto No.1	Central Jakarta	Special Capital Region of Jakarta	
RS Siloam Gleneagles Hospital	Jl. Siloam 6	Lippo Karawaci, Tangerang	West Java	
RS Sint Carolus	JI. Salemba Raya 41	Central Jakarta	Special Capital Region of Jakarta	
RS Siti Hajar Sidoarjo	JI. Raden Patah No 70	Sidoarjo	Sidoarjo Regency	
RS Siti Khodijah Pekalongan	JI. Bandung 39 - 47	Pekalongan	Central Java	
RS Siti Khodijaj	JI. Pahlawan 260 Sepanjang	Sidoarjo	Sidoarjo Regency	
RS St. Elisabeth Purwokerto	JI. Jend Gatot Subroto No 44	Purwokerto	Banyumas Regency	
RS St. Elizabeth Bantul	JI. Ganjuran, Sumber Mulya	Bantul, Yogyakarta	Special Region of Yogyakarta	
RS St. Theresia	JI. Dr. Sutomo No19		Jambi	
RS STlla Maris	Jl. Somba Opu No 273	Makassar	South Sulawesi	
RS Sunter Agung	JI. Agung Utara Raya Blok A, No1	North Jakarta	Special Capital Region of Jakarta	
RS Surabaya International	JI. Nginden Intan Brt BI. B	Surabaya	East Java	
RS Tebet	JI. Letjen MT, Haryono No 8	South Jakarta	Special Capital Region of Jakarta	
RS TK. II Pelamonia	JI. Jend. Sudirman No 27	Makassar	South Sulawesi	
RS Tria Dipa	JI. Raya Pasar Minggu No 3A, Pancoran	South Jakarta	Special Capital Region of Jakarta	
RS Tugu Ibu Cimanggis	JI. Raya Bogor Km 29	Cimanggis, Depok	West Java	
RS Tumbah Kembang	JI. Raya Bogor Km 31 No 23, Pal Sigunung	Cimanggis, Depok	West Java	
RS Usada Insani	JI. KH. Hasyim Ashari 24	Tangerang	Banten	
RS Vincentius Singkawang	JI. Pangeran Diponegoro No 5, Singkawang	Sidoarjo	Sidoarjo Regency	
RS William Booth	JI. Diponegoro No 34	Surabaya	East Java	
RS Woodward Palu	JI. L.H. Woodward No 1	Palu	Central Sulawesi	
RS Yadika	Jl. Pahlawan Revoiusi No 4	Pondok Bambu	East Jakarta	
RS Yayasan Panti Raharja, SAWO	JI. Sawo No 58 -60	Central Jakarta	Special Capital Region of Jakarta	
RS Yos Sudarso	JI. Situjuh No 1	Padang	West Sumatra	
RSAB Harapan Kita	JI. Letjen S Parman Kav 87	Slipi, West Jakarta	Special Capital Region of Jakarta	
RSAL Bitung	JI. Vos Sudarso No 26	Bitung	North Sulawesi	
RSAL Dr. Ramelan	JI. Gadung No 1	Surabaya	East Java	
RS Galang COVID-19 Facility		Galang Island	Barelang	

== Clinics ==
- Clinic Hosana Medika Cibitung, Bekasi
- Clinic Hosana Medika, Bekasi
- Clinic Hosana Medika Lippo, Bekasi
- Clinic Hosana Medika Tambun, Bekasi
- Clinic Renicha Putra Cikarang, Bekasi
- Clinic Yayasan Mulya Medika, Bekasi Timor
- Global Doctor Jakarta Clinic, South Jakarta
- Graha Medika Hospital, Jakarta
- International Medical Clinic - Bali, Bali
- International Medical Clinic - Jakarta 1
- International Medical Clinic - Jakarta 2
- Kimia Farma Clinic, Bali
- Klinik Amanah, Bogor
- Klinik Asih, Batam
- Klinik dan RB Bhakti Asih, Tangerang
- Klinik Dr. Zakky Mach Fuad, Bekasi
- Klinik Fajar Medika, Bekasi
- Klinik Galuh Pakuan, Bandung
- Klinik Grace Batu Aji, Batam
- Klinik Grace Marina, Batam
- Klinik Grace Nagoya, Batam
- Klinik Medifarma Pondok Cabe, Pamulang
- Klinik Medis Pusara Gresik, Gresik

== Other ==
- KRI Semarang (594), a hospital ship of the Indonesian Navy, a BRS (Indonesian: Bantu Rumah Sakit, lit. 'Hospital Assistance Ship')
- KRI dr. Soeharso (990), a hospital ship of the Indonesian Navy, a BRS (Indonesian: Bantu Rumah Sakit, lit. 'Hospital Assistance Ship')
- Sudirohusodo-class hospital ship, an Indonesian Navy ship class of hospital ships (BRS: Indonesian: Bantu Rumah Sakit, lit. 'Hospital Assistance Ship')
  - KRI dr. Wahidin Sudirohusodo (991), a Sudirohusodo-class hospital ship of the Indonesian Navy
  - KRI dr. Radjiman Wedyodiningrat (992), a Sudirohusodo-class hospital ship of the Indonesian Navy
