= Christian University of Palangka Raya =

Higher education facility in Central Kalimantan, Indonesia

- Universitas Kristen Palangka Raya
- Other names: UNKRIP
- Motto: 'The fear of the Lord is the beginning of knowledge' (Proverbs 1:7)
- Type: Private University
- Established: 04 September 1987
- Rector: Dr. Benius, S.E. M.M.
- Location: Jl. RTA Milono Km 8.5, Palangka Raya, Central Kalimantan, Indonesia
- Website: UNKRIP website

The Christian University of Palangka Raya (Universitas Kristen Palangka Raya, shortened to UNKRIP) is a private higher education facility in Palangka Raya, Central Kalimantan, Indonesia, which was established in 1987. The university comprises five faculties: the Faculty of Fisheries, Faculty of Social and Political Sciences, Faculty of Engineering, Faculty of Farming and Faculty of Teaching and Education. The current Rector is Dr. Benius, S.E., M.M., who replaced the previous Rector, Dr. Siun Jarias, S.H., M.H..

The management of UNKRIP is under the governance of Eka Sinta Christian Higher Education Foundation and the Evangelical Church of Kalimantan (GKE).

== Brief history ==
UNKRIP was set up by the GKE, under the governance of the Eka Sinta Christian Higher Education Foundation, on 18 May 1987. The university was formally recognized by the Level I Governor of Central Kalimantan, Mr Gatot Amrih, S.H. on 4 September 1987; that date has since been considered the anniversary of UNKRIP. It was the initiative of Christian members of the community who wanted to strengthen science and technology education as an aid to community development, and decided to set up a higher education institution covering not only Theology but also several scientific disciplines. With the support of the Central Kalimantan Regional Government, the GKE through the Eka Sinta Education Foundation established a private university in Palangka Raya which went on to be named the Christian University of Palangka Raya (Universitas Kristen Palangkaraya), with the motto "The fear of the Lord is the beginning of knowledge" (Proverbs 1:7).

== Faculties ==
UNKRIP has five faculties offering undergraduate degrees, four of which are accredited by the National Higher Education Accreditation Board (BAN-PT):

- Faculty of Fisheries (accreditation level B)
- Faculty of Social and Political Sciences (accreditation level B)
- Faculty of Engineering (accreditation level C)
- Faculty of Farming (accreditation level C)
- Faculty of Teaching and Education

The university publishes the Journal of Tropical Animal Science.

== Facilities ==
The UNKRIP campus is located 8.5 km from the center of Palangka Raya.
