= Musamus Merauke University =

Public university in South Papua, Indonesia

- Universitas Musamus Merauke
- Motto: Jangan Tanya Kerjaku, Tetapi Lihatlah Hasil Karyaku
- Type: Public
- Established: 26 January 2001 (academy); 22 November 2010 (university)
- Rector: Dr. Drs. Beatus Tambaip, M.A.
- Location: Merauke, South Papua, Indonesia; 8°31′54.7″S 140°25′1.5″E
- Website: unmus.ac.id

Musamus Merauke University (Indonesian: Universitas Musamus Merauke, often abbreviated UNMUS) is a public university in Merauke, South Papua, Indonesia. The only public university (Perguruan Tinggi Negeri) in South Papua, it is located at the southeastern corner of the Merauke main town and next to its airport.

The university was founded in 2006, after having been a technological academy for 5 years. Later on, it was absorbed by the Ministry of Education and became a public university.

== History ==
The university was initially founded as Sekolah Tinggi Teknologi Merauke (Merauke Technological Academy) on 26 January 2001. Their first cohort of 99 earned diploma degrees in 2005, and in the same year feasibility studies began for its conversion into a university. Following an investigation by the Indonesian Ministry of Education, the institute received its operational permit as a university on 16 August 2006, officially making it into a private university. On April the same year, president Susilo Bambang Yudhoyono stated that "there shall be a public university in Merauke within the next two years". Following further investigations, the university handed its assets to the central government on 23 May 2009, and was officially made a public university on 22 November 2010.

More recently, there have been complaints about the underrepresentation of native Papuan people in the university's teaching staff. In 2016, the rectorate election of UNMUS was postponed by the Ministry of Research, Technology and Higher Education (Kemenristekdikti) due to irregularities in the voting university senate. In 2016, it was placed 251st in rank from 3,244 universities and other higher education institutes in Indonesia by Kemenristekdikti.

== Faculties and students ==
The university accepts students through the SNMPTN and SBMPTN, as with other public universities in Indonesia. The university provided 260 slots across all programs for the latter's exam-based selection for 2017 intake.

The university has the following faculties:

1. Faculty of Agriculture
2. Faculty of Engineering
3. Faculty of Economy and Business
4. Faculty of Education
5. Faculty of Social and Political Sciences
6. Faculty of Law

== See also ==
- Education in Indonesia
- MIFEE
