= Atinggola =

- Town and district
- Location in Sulawesi
- Coordinates: 0°53′15″N 123°07′11″E
- Country: Indonesia
- Province: Gorontalo
- Regency: Gorontalo Regency

Atinggola is a small town and district in Gorontalo Regency in Gorontalo, northern Sulawesi, Indonesia. It is located on the Celebes Sea. In 1981 the district had a population of around 15,000 Bolango people. The people speak a local dialect of the Bolango language, called the Atinggola language.
