= Gorontalo (city) =

Capital and largest city of Gorontalo, Indonesia

Gorontalo Hulontalo (Gorontalo)
- City
- City of Gorontalo; Kota Gorontalo
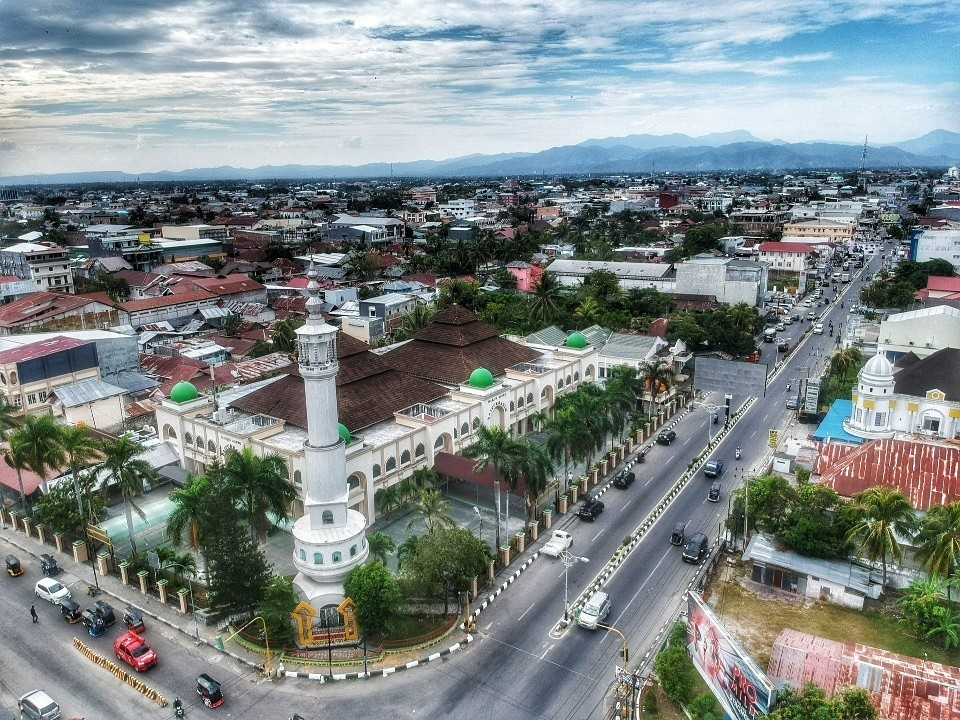
- A view of Gorontalo

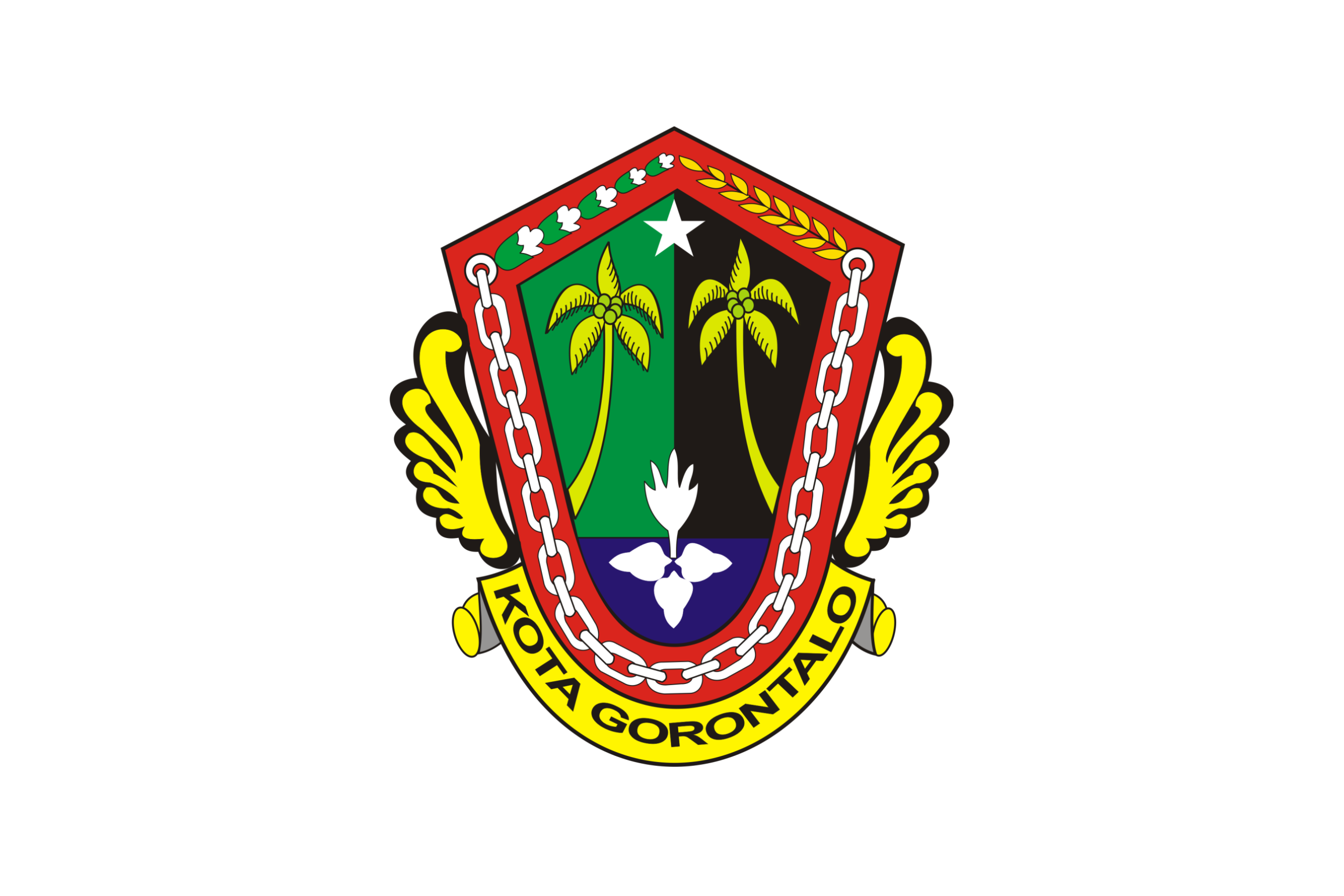
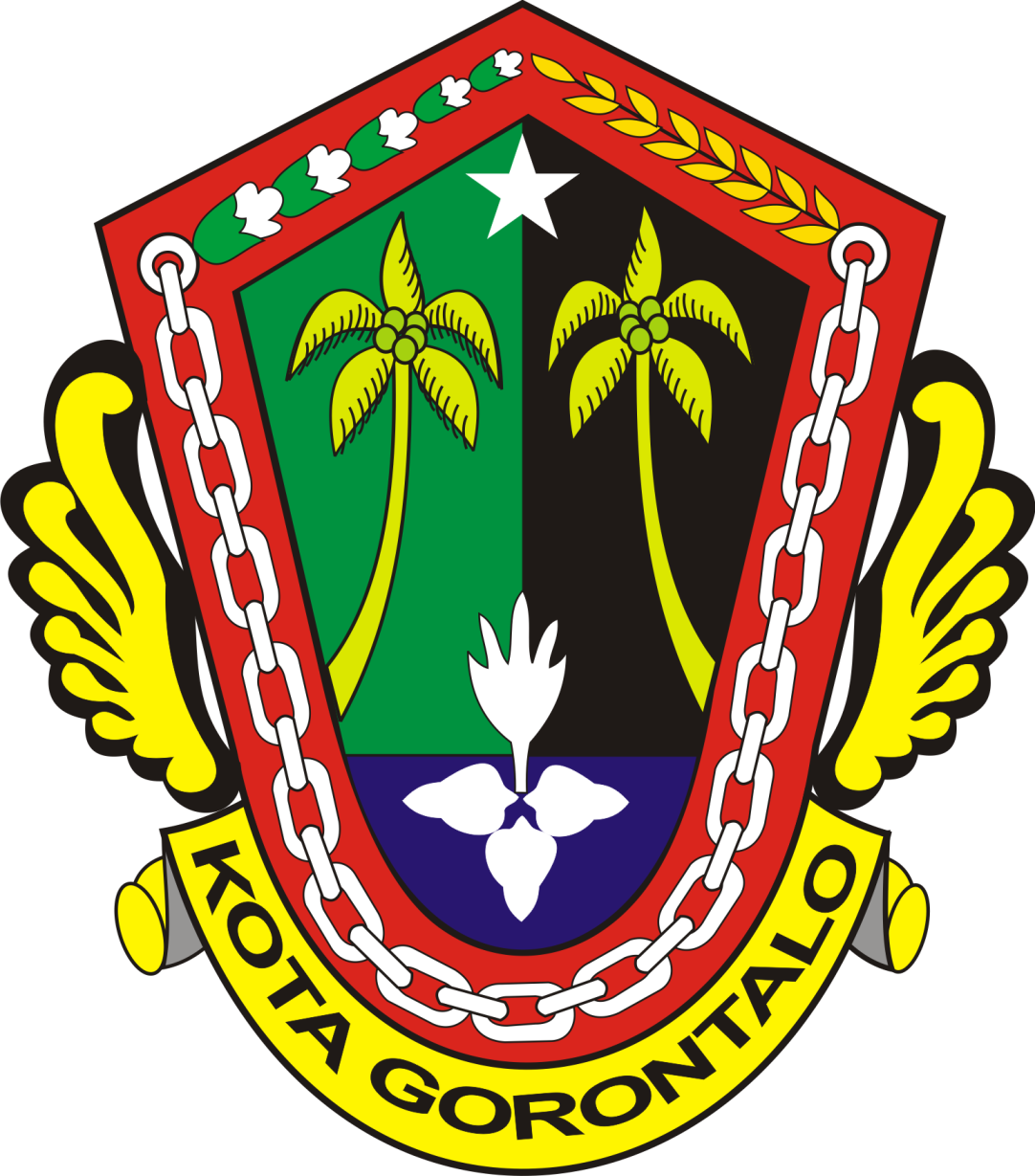
- Flag Coat of arms

- Location within Gorontalo Province

- Location in Sulawesi and Indonesia Gorontalo (Indonesia)
- Coordinates: 0°32′32″N 123°03′41″E
- Country: Indonesia
- Province: Gorontalo

Government
  - Mayor: Adhan Dambea (Gerindra)
  - Vice Mayor: Indra Gobel
  - Legislature: Gorontalo City Regional House of Representatives

Area
  - Total: 70.9 km^{2} (27.4 sq mi)
- Elevation: 9 m (30 ft)

Population (mid 2025 estimate)
  - Total: 204,805
  - Density: 2,890/km^{2} (7,480/sq mi)
- Time zone: UTC+8 (Indonesia Central Time)
- Area code: (+62) 435
- HDI (2022): ▲0.782 (High)
- Website: www.gorontalokota.go.id

Gorontalo (Gorontalo: Hulontalo) is a city and the capital of the Gorontalo Province, Sulawesi, Indonesia. The city has a land area of 70.9 km^{2} and had a population of 179,991 at the 2010 census and 198,539 at the 2020 census; the official estimate as at mid 2025 was 204,805 (comprising 101,844 males and 102,961 females). Previously part of North Sulawesi, it became the capital of the newly-formed Gorontalo Province on 5 December 2000 when that province was separated from North Sulawesi. As the largest settlement and the only city in the province, it is the economic, political, and educational center of the province, hosting most of its higher education facilities and the location of one of the only two public universities in the province.

The city is also cultural center of the Gorontalo people and have been under various small kingdoms and later the Islamic rulers of the Gorontalo Sultanate, among others before being incorporated under Dutch East Indies as Afdeling Gorontalo and then later kotapraja under the Indonesian Republic. Due to relatively religious culture of the Gorontaloan people and its history with Islam, the city is sometimes referred to as "Porch of Medina".

== History ==
=== Etymology ===
There are several theories regarding the origin of the city's name. One theory suggest that it was shortened version of Huluntalangio, name of a kingdom in the area which became Hulontalo. Later during the first contact with the Dutch explorers, Dutch people find it difficult to spell Hulontalo and the word became corrupted to "Gorontalo" which stuck as the name of the city to this day. Other theories include Hulutalangi which means "more honourable", Hulua lo tola which means "place for gabus fish (Channa striata) to breed", Pogolatalo which means "place to wait", or directly Gorontalo which is derived from name of a Moluccas ruler Gorontalo of Tidore.

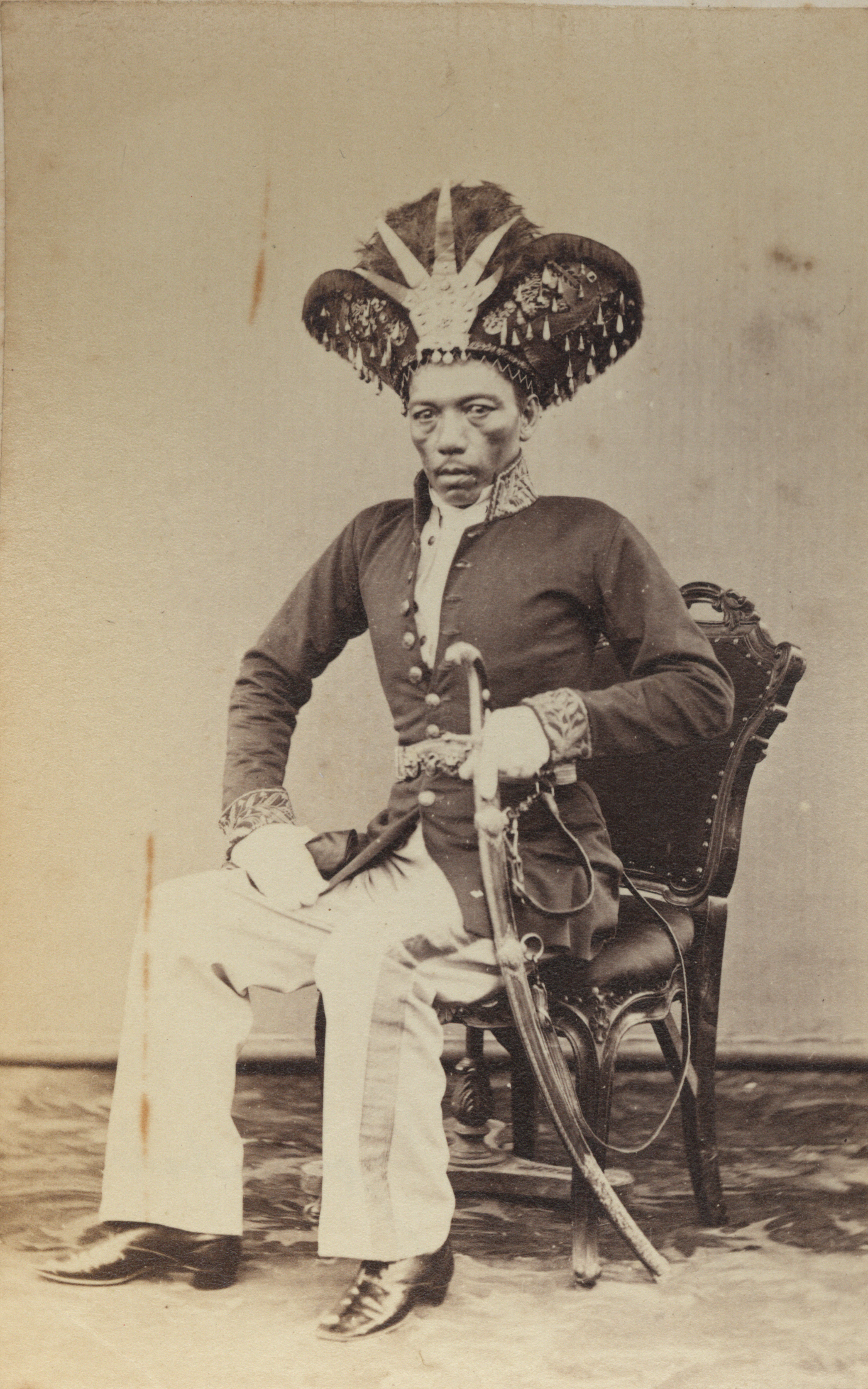
King of Gorontalo, from around 1868

=== Early and colonial history ===
Gorontalo city is considered among the oldest cities in Sulawesi, dating back approximately 400 years together with Makassar, Parepare, and Manado. It was the center of Islamic propagation in Sulawesi under Ternate rule. The area that what is now the city was once a region (Pohala) under Kingdom of Gorontalo. The kingdom consisted of alliances of 17 smaller groups called linula. Kingdom of Gorontalo was a vassal under Ternate Sultanate in Moluccas. Islamic propagation in the region around the today's city started between 14th and 15th centuries, started with the period under the ruler named Sultan Amai who married a princess from nearby Palase Gomonjolo Kingdom, who asked the Sultan Amai previously to convert to Islam as part of the marriage arrangement in 1525. Islam later spread to the Gorontalo Kingdom and became official religion of the kingdom under rule of King Matolodulakiki. During this period, principle of Gorontaloan culture regarding Islam which is "adat basandi syara', syara' basandi kitabullah" (traditions based on Sharia, Sharia based on Qur'an) was coined.

Native rule in this area ended with transfer of all Ternate's Sulawesi possessions to the Dutch East India Company (VOC) under a treaty which became effective on 11 May 1677. This transfer of possession includes Gorontalo and its neighbouring kingdoms in the northern part of Sulawesi. Dutch East India Company built its first trade office around the area of what is now the city in 1705 to organize trade relations with the native kingdoms which is now under the company's rule. Later, Dutch rule in the area was strengthened by the construction of Nassare Fort in 1770. As Dutch East India Company dissolves in 1799, the area became direct possession of the Dutch and later Dutch East Indies colony. From then, the Dutch became increasingly involved in successions and appointment of local rulers.

In 1824, the area around Gorontalo was merged with Minahasan region to become an afdeeling which is led by an assistant resident. In 1899, another administrative change took place which made Gorontalo immediately administrated from Batavia, the form that was called "Rechtstreeks Bestuur". In 1911, again another administrative change took place, this time the pohala was reorganized and became divided into three onder afdeelingen, which are Kwandang, Boalemo, and Gorontalo. In 1920, onder afdeeling was changed into district. At this time, Gorontalo region was divided into five districts including Limboto and Bone. This change did not last long and later in 1922 it was divided and reorganized again into three afdeelingen, which are Gorontalo, Boalemo, and Buol.

=== World War II and post-independence era ===
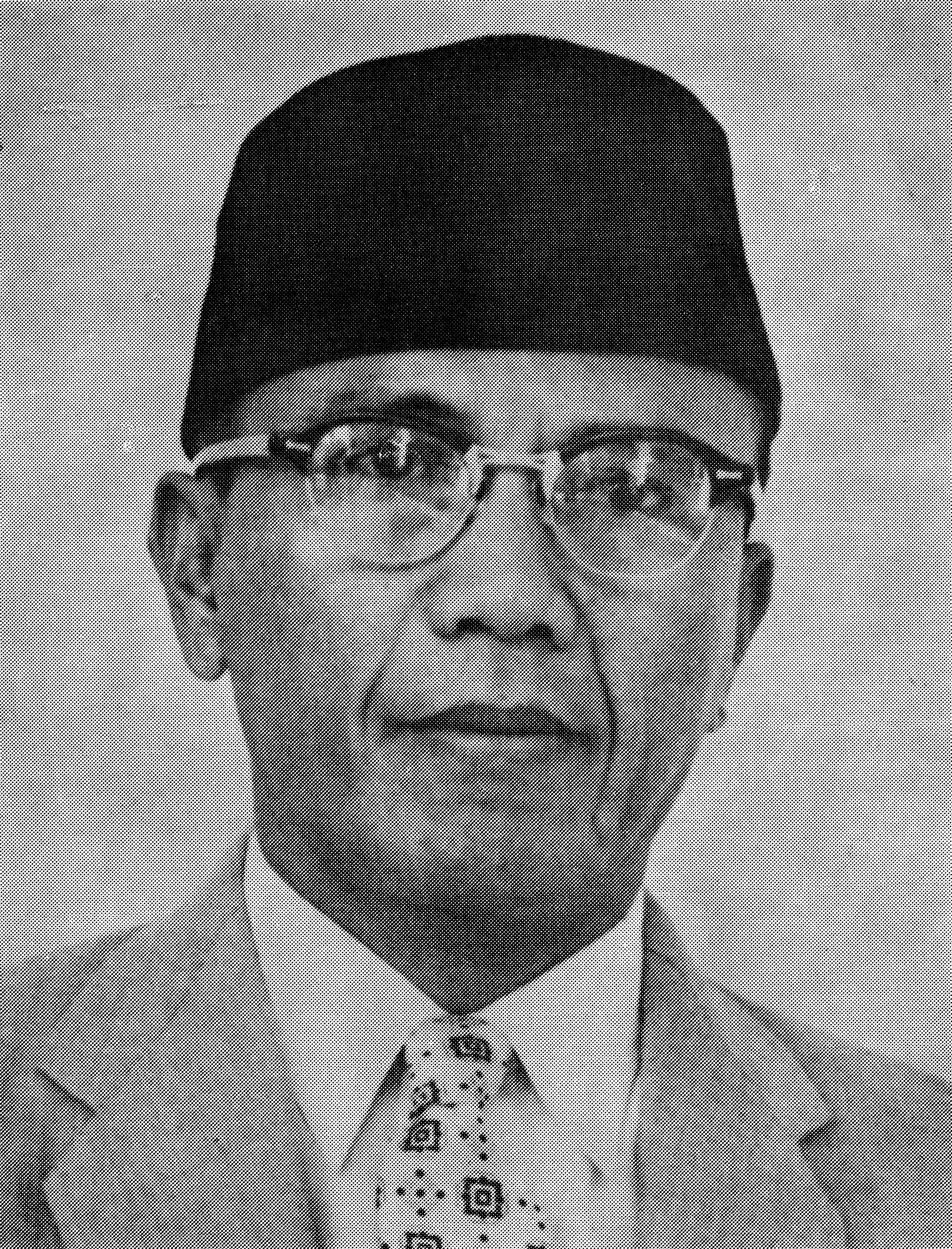
Nani Wartabone, leader of Merah Putih movement, a revolt centered around Gorontalo and Central Sulawesi region

Just before the invasion of the region by Empire of Japan during World War II, a revolt broke out led by Nani Wartabone who declared Indonesian independence on 23 January 1942 under Merah Putih (Red and White) movement, around three years before it would be formally declared again by Sukarno. However, the revolt was later suppressed by occupying Imperial Japanese Navy who assumed control of Sulawesi and East Indonesia. After World War II and the aftermath of the Indonesian National Revolution, Gorontalo became part of State of East Indonesia as a neoswapraja together with Mongondow and Buol. When State of East Indonesia was dissolved in 1950, Gorontalo became part of North Sulawesi region under then-Sulawesi Province. In 1954, neoswapraja Mongondow was separated from North Sulawesi, leaving only Buol and Gorontalo as part of it. Later, in accordance of Law Number 1 of 1957, as Indonesia reorganized its administrative structure, Gorontalo became part of first-level administrative division (daerah tingkat I) and Gorontalo city was separated from Gorontalo Regency, granting the city status of kotapraja. During Permesta rebellion, the city hosts Indonesian military radio used to persuade the rebels to surrender.

The city became the capital of the newly created province of Gorontalo in 2000 and has since seen urban growth and took more significant importance, being the center of the new province's economy, educational, and administrative functions, especially between 2006 and 2007 where the new province overall saw rapid economic growth and massive increase of its gross regional product.

== Geography ==
Gorontalo shares its borders with Bone Bolango Regency to the north and east, Tomini Gulf to the south, and Gorontalo Regency to the west. The city's urban area is now extended beyond these administrative borders to include suburbs in the adjacent kecamatan (districts) of Gorontalo Regency and Bone Bolango Regency.

=== Climate ===
Gorontalo has a relatively dry tropical rainforest climate (Köppen Af) with moderate rainfall year-round.

Climate data for Gorontalo
Month	Jan	Feb	Mar	Apr	May	Jun	Jul	Aug	Sep	Oct	Nov	Dec	Year
Mean daily maximum °C (°F)	30.8 (87.4)	30.8 (87.4)	31.2 (88.2)	31.9 (89.4)	31.7 (89.1)	31.0 (87.8)	30.8 (87.4)	31.4 (88.5)	32.1 (89.8)	32.5 (90.5)	32.2 (90.0)	31.5 (88.7)	31.5 (88.7)
Daily mean °C (°F)	26.7 (80.1)	26.6 (79.9)	26.9 (80.4)	27.4 (81.3)	27.4 (81.3)	26.8 (80.2)	26.6 (79.9)	26.8 (80.2)	27.1 (80.8)	27.3 (81.1)	27.5 (81.5)	27.2 (81.0)	27.0 (80.6)
Mean daily minimum °C (°F)	22.6 (72.7)	22.5 (72.5)	22.7 (72.9)	22.9 (73.2)	23.2 (73.8)	22.7 (72.9)	22.5 (72.5)	22.3 (72.1)	22.1 (71.8)	22.2 (72.0)	22.9 (73.2)	22.9 (73.2)	22.6 (72.7)
Average rainfall mm (inches)	101 (4.0)	95 (3.7)	101 (4.0)	105 (4.1)	148 (5.8)	133 (5.2)	117 (4.6)	74 (2.9)	67 (2.6)	99 (3.9)	128 (5.0)	117 (4.6)	1,285 (50.4)

== Governance ==
=== Administrative districts ===
As the time of the 2010 census, the city was divided into six districts (kecamatan), and an additional three districts were subsequently created by the splitting of existing districts. The districts are tabulated below with their areas and their populations at the 2010 census and the 2020 census, together with the official estimates as at mid 2025. The table also includes the locations of the district administrative centres, the number of administrative villages (all urban kelurahan) in each district, and its postal codes.

Name of district (kecamatan)	Area in km^{2}	Pop'n Census 2010	Pop'n Census 2020	Pop'n estimate mid 2025	Admin centre	Number of kelurahan	Post codes
Kota Barat	14.1	20,220	24,011	25,089	Buladu	7	96131 - 96136
Dungingi	4.4	21,568	25,439	26,828	Huangobotu	5	96135 - 96139
Kota Selatan	2.8	35,988	20,287	20,355	Biawu	5	96111 - 96115
Kota Timur	5.0	42,155	26,691	26,799	Moodu	6	96112 - 96119
Hulonthalangi	12.2	^{(a)}	16,352	16,955	Tenda	5	96111 - 96117
Dumbo Raya	14.4	^{(a)}	18,489	19,635	Talumolo	5	96112 - 96119
Kota Utara	8.4	33,149	20,692	21,988	Dolomo Selatan	6	96121 - 96123
Kota Tengah	4.9	27,047	27,398	27,394	Pulubala	6	96127 - 96129
Sipatana	4.7	^{(a)}	19,180	19,762	Molosipat U	5	96121 - 96126
Totals	70.9	180,127	198,539	204,805		50	

Note: (a) 2010 population included with that of the district from which it was cut out in March 2011.

=== Government and politics ===
As with all Indonesian cities, Gorontalo is a second-level administrative division run by a mayor and a vice mayor together with the city parliament, and is equivalent to a regency. Executive power is vested in the mayor and vice mayor, while legislative duties are vested in the local parliament. The mayor, vice mayor, and parliament members are directly elected by the people of the city in an election. Heads of districts are appointed by the mayor on the recommendation of the city secretary.

On provincial level, the city is part of Gorontalo 1st electoral district which only consist of the city itself. This electoral district sends 8 representatives to the provincial parliament which has total seats of 45. On city level, the city is divided into four electoral districts which have total of 25 seats. The last election was in 2019 and the next one is scheduled for 2024.

Electoral district	Region	Representatives
Gorontalo City 1st	Kota Selatan, Hulonthalangi	5
Gorontalo City 2n	Kota Barat, Dungingi	6
Gorontalo City 3rd	Kota Utara, Kota Tengah, Sipatana	8
Gorontalo City 4th	Kota Timur, Dumbo Raya	6
Total		25

== Economy ==
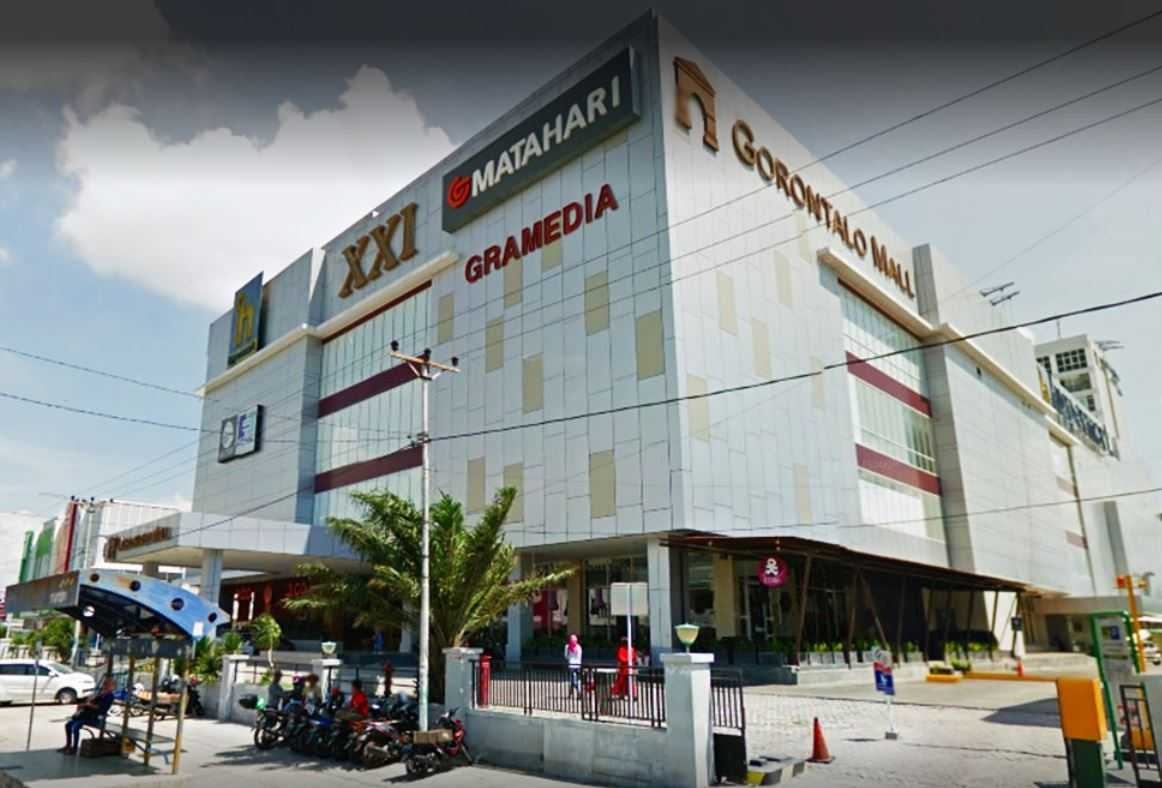
A mall in Gorontalo, the city's economy is dominated by trading and service

The economy of the city is diverse, with largest sector being trade accounts for 16.98% of the city's gross regional product, followed by construction sector with 13.01%, and then finance sector with 10.50%. Other sectors include mining with 5.28% and agriculture with 4.66 in 2022. The economic growth of the city was 4.1% in 2022, an increase from 2.83% in 2021. The growth has been consistently being the highest in the province except in 2020 on which the city's GDRP briefly shrank 0.02% in 2020 due to COVID-19 pandemic. The city has the second largest economy in the province after Gorontalo Regency.

=== Agriculture and fisheries ===
The city has relatively small agricultural output compared to its neighbours. The city produces 41.9 tonnes of chili pepper, 41.9 tonnes of tomato, 225.3 tonnes of banana, 188.5 tonnes of mango, 29.8 tonnes of jackfruit, and 13.5 tonnes of papaya in 2022. Livestock also present in the city which includes 3,847 cattles, 13,509 goats, 127,018 chickens, and 9,675 ducks. From this, the city in 2022 produced 1,780 tonnes of beef, 277 tonnes of mutton, 1,211 tonnes of chicken meat, and 1.65 tonnes of duck meat. Fish catch from the sea was 17,291 tonnes and also 177.3 tonnes of freshwater catch within the same year.

According to the city's spatial plan document for 2019 to 2039, 183.27 hectares of land in the city outskirt of Kota Utara and Sipatana districts will be developed with construction of new irrigation system. Meanwhile, in Hulonthalangi District exist port facilities specifically to accommodate fishing industry such as dedicated fishing port and fish auction house.

=== Mining ===
Mining as a sector is also relatively small in the city, with only 29.971 hectares allocated for it within Hulonthalangi District. This sector only constitute 5.28% of the city's GDRP in 2022.

=== Trade ===
Trade and other service sector dominates the city's economy. According to the spatial plan document of the city, 1,066.408 hectares of the city's land are dedicated to shophouses, market buildings, and many other facilities facilitating trading and service sector. The sector contributes 1,656 billion Rupiah in 2022 to the city's GDRP. The city has various trading centers and market buildings such as in Kota Selatan District and Tapa Business Center in Siptana District. The city also has eight weekly markets registered, as well as one main central market building. Being capital of the province, the city is where trading and service sector concentrated within the province.

=== Tourism and hospitality ===
The city has total of 58 accommodations from regular to budget hotels, in addition to 288 registered restaurants within the city boundaries. The city was visited by 138,064 tourists in 2021 and this figure later increased to 164,986 in 2022. From the figure, 679 visitors in 2022 were international tourists from abroad. This figure is an increase from previous year of 2021 with only 292 visitors, but both figure still has not recovered to the figure of 2019 with 3,720 international tourists. Tourism sector and hotel occupancy as of 2022 seen signs of recovering from previous COVID-19 pandemic.

== Demographics ==
Composition of the city's demographics is dominated by age group between 20 – 24 years old. In 2022, the age group of 0 – 4 years old outnumbered age group of 5 - 9, suggesting that Gorontalo saw increase in births that year. Most of the population, with figures of 66.04%, are at economically active age between 15 and 59 years old. Sex ratio in Gorontalo is 99, below 100 figure which means the population of female is more the population of male in the city. The city has life expectancy of 72.53 years in 2022, a slight increase from previous year's 72.49, and not far from the national figure of 73.6 years. The city's fertility meanwhile, is decreasing from figures of 2,38 during 2010 Census to 2,17 according to 2020 long form's census. Infant mortality rate of the city was also decreasing from 32 per 1,000 babies to 22 per 1,000 babies between the two census. Literacy rate in 2022 was 99.65% for age above 15 years old.

== Education ==
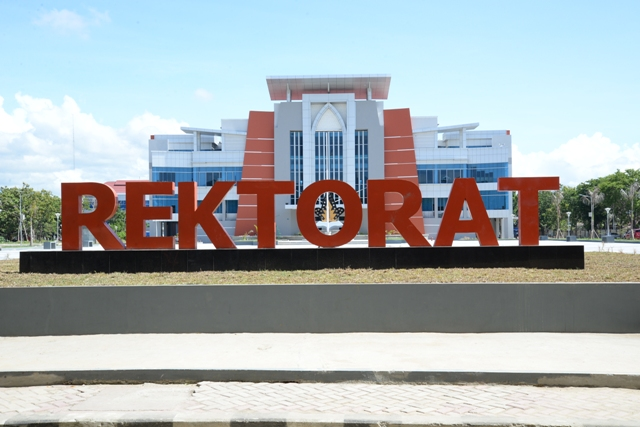
State University of Gorontalo rectorate building

The city has 490 kindergartens, 121 elementary schools, 31 junior highschools, 17 senior highschools, in addition to 9 vocational highschools and 7 tertiary education institutions. State University of Gorontalo is the main university in the province which accepts students through national selection and entrance exams. State University of Gorontalo is the sole public university in the province. Other universities and institutions in the city includes Gorontalo Muhammadiyah University, Gorontalo University, Ichsan Gorontalo University, among others. The city hosts the province's main public library and archive center, H.B. Jassin Public Library which was named after HB Jassin, a literary critic from the province.

== Healthcare ==
The city has total of 7 hospitals, 2 maternity hospitals, 16 polyclinics, 41 puskesmas (community healthcare centers), and 29 pharmacies. There are also 19 clinics and 128 posyandu or healthcare centers. Main referral and the largest hospital in the city is Dr. H. Aloei Saboe Regional General Hospital which is categorized as B-class hospital by Ministry of Health and is the largest hospital in the entire province. Other smaller hospitals include Otanaha Regional Hospital categorized as C-class which is managed by the city government, Tk. IV Gorontalo Hospital which is managed by Indonesian Army, Gorontalo Bhayangkara Hospital which is managed by Indonesian National Police, among others.

== Transportation ==
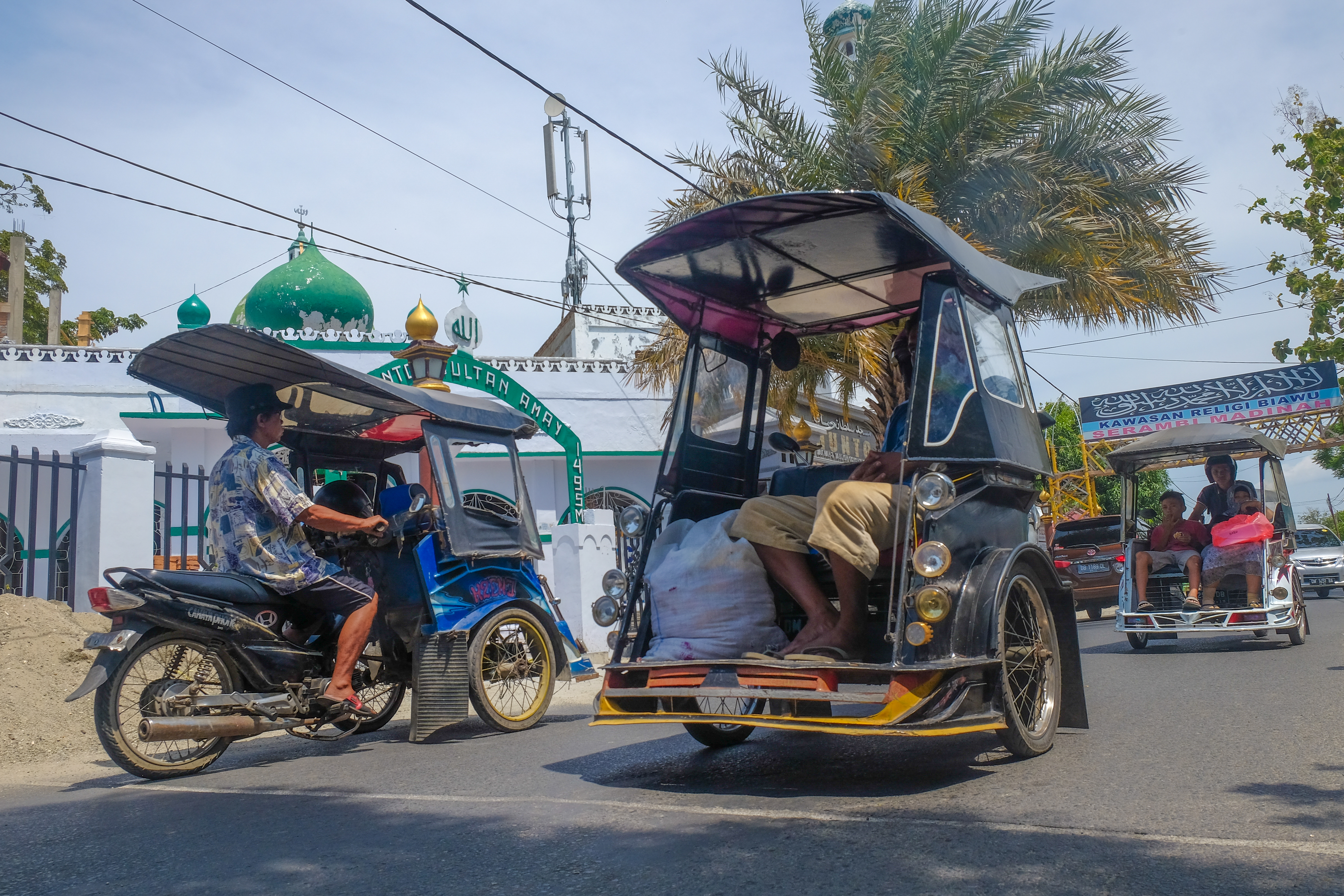
Auto rickshaw in Gorontalo

The city has 233.15 kilometers of road within the city boundaries as of 2022. Of this, 21.15 kilometers are national roads, 47.34 kilometers are provincial roads, and the rest are city roads maintained by the city government. As of 2022, the total length of paved roads in the city was 197.20 kilometers. Part of the road infrastructure is Gorontalo Outer Ring Road or often referred as GORR. The ringroad has length of 46.2 kilometers which connect Jalaluddin Airport to Gorontalo Port, bypassing most of the city's urban area. The closest airport to the city is Jalaluddin Airport which is located in the neighbouring Gorontalo Regency. The airport was expanded and a new terminal building was built in 2015 and inaugurated in 2016. The city is also served by four seaports, among them is Gorontalo Port.

Public transport in the city consist of mostly angkot and auto rickshaw locally called bentor. There are three major ride-hailing services in the city, which are Gojek, Grab, and Maxim. The city launched an urban bus system named Trans NKRI during the province's 19th anniversary with three routes serving major universities and schools in the city. However, the service gradually decline and eventually stopped during COVID-19 pandemic, leaving the city with no urban bus system as of 2024.
