= Teuku Umar University =

Indonesian university

- Universitas Teuku Umar
- Motto: Source of Inspiration
- Type: Public
- Established: 10 November 2006 (university)
- Rector: Jasman J. Ma'ruf
- Location: Meulaboh, Aceh, Indonesia; 4°8′44.2″N 96°11′50.4″E
- Website: utu.ac.id

Teuku Umar University (Indonesian: Universitas Teuku Umar, abbreviated UTU) is an Indonesian public university in Meulaboh, West Aceh Regency. Starting from a foundation in 1984, it became a university in 2006 and was nationalized to form the current public university (Perguruan Tinggi Negeri) in 2014.

== History ==
A foundation preceding the institution was founded on 28 August 1984 by residents of West Aceh Regency, and the first educational institute took the form of "Meulaboh Agricultural Academy". It was renamed to Sekolah Tinggi Ilmu Pertanian (Institute for Agricultural Science) in 1993, and after the tsunami it was officially awarded university status in 2006.

On 2 April 2014, it was officially integrated by the Ministry of Education and became a public university (Perguruan Tinggi Negeri), the fourth in the province (after Syiah Kuala and Ar-Raniry University in Banda Aceh and Malikussaleh University in Lhokseumawe) and the first in the west and south parts.

== Students ==
The university had an intake of 1,640 in the 2016–2017 academic year, spanning 15 courses across six faculties. It participates in the SNMPTN and SBMPTN system, accepting 40 percent of its students from the high school results-based SNMPTN and another 30 from the exam-based SBMPTN, with other specific methods making up the rest. It claimed a total number of active students at 9,364 in July 2017, mostly coming from Aceh with some attendants from outside the province.

== Faculties and facilities ==
The faculties in the university are Social and Political Sciences, Agriculture, Engineering, Economics, Public Health and Maritime Sciences. Of these, only the first are fully accredited "B" ("good") by the Indonesian University Accrediting Body.
