= Gorontalo Regency =

Regency in Gorontalo, Indonesia

Coordinates: 0°38′N 122°58′E

Gorontalo Regency Kabupaten Gorontalo
- Regency
- Limboto monument

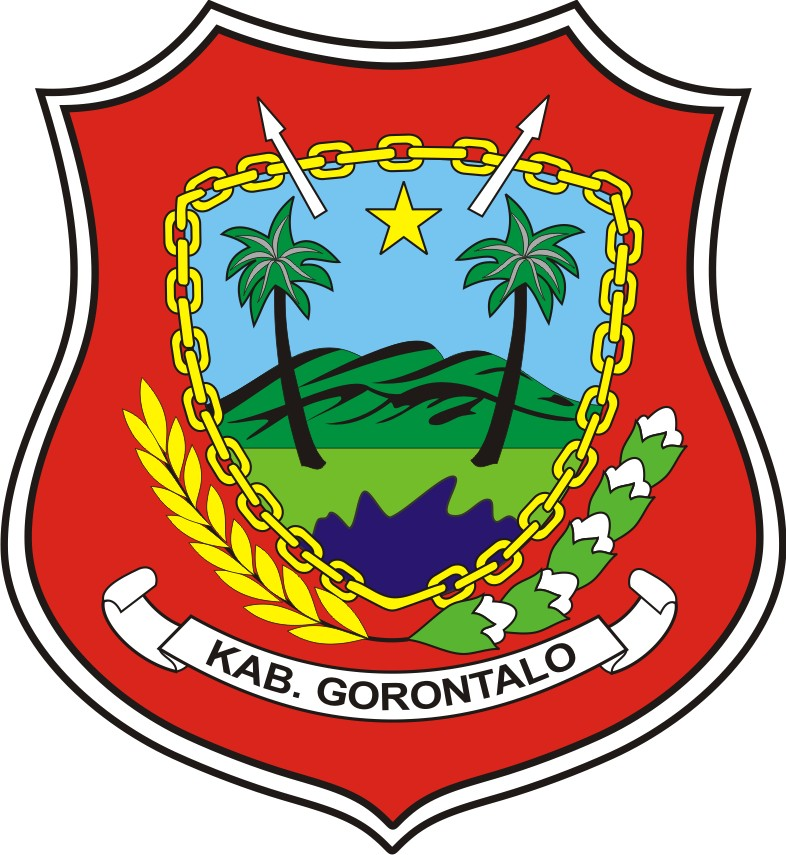
- Coat of arms

- Country: Indonesia
- Province: Gorontalo
- Capital: Limboto

Government
  - Regent: Sofyan Puhi
  - Vice Regent: Tonny S. Junus

Area
  - Total: 2,188.82 km^{2} (845.11 sq mi)

Population (mid 2025 estimate)
  - Total: 428,370
  - Density: 195.71/km^{2} (506.88/sq mi)

Gorontalo is a regency of Gorontalo Province, Indonesia, on the island of Sulawesi. It was established in 1959 under Law No. 29/1959 from the remaining parts of North Sulawesi Regency (not to be confused with the current province), but has subsequently been reduced in area as additional regencies have been cut out of it. It now has an area of 2,188.82 km^{2} and had a population of 355,988 at the 2010 Census and 393,107 at the 2020 Census; the official estimate as at mid 2025 was 428,370 (comprising 215,708 males and 212,552 females). The administrative headquarters of the regency is in the town of Limboto.

== Administrative districts ==
At the time of the 2010 Census the Regency was divided into seventeen districts (kecamatan), but two additional districts (Dungaliyo and Bilato) have subsequently been created by splitting of existing districts. The districts are tabulated below with their areas and their populations at the 2010 Census and 2020 Census, together with the official estimates as at mid 2025. The table also includes the locations of the district administrative centres, the number of administrative villages in each district (totaling 191 rural desa and 14 urban kelurahan - the latter being those comprising the district of Limboto town), and its postal codes.

| Kode Wilayah | Name of District (kecamatan) | Area in km^{2} | Pop'n Census 2010 | Pop'n Census 2020 | Pop'n Estimate mid 2025 | Admin centre | No. of villages | Post codes |
|---|---|---|---|---|---|---|---|---|
| 75.01.05 | Batudaa Pantai | 65.69 | 10,884 | 11,886 | 12,673 | Kayu Bulan | 9 | 96244 |
| 75.01.20 | Biluhu | 80.73 | 7,601 | 8,267 | 8,811 | Lobuto Timur | 8 | 96245 |
| 75.01.03 | Batudaa | 40.45 | 12,914 | 14,330 | 15,433 | Payunga | 8 | 96243 |
| 75.01.11 | Bongomeme | 139.88 | 33,253 | 19,080 | 21,207 | Dulamayo | 15 | 96246 |
| 75.01.19 | Tabongo | 51.84 | 16,214 | 18,284 | 19,904 | Tabongo Timur | 9 | 96242 |
| 75.01.24 | Dungaliyo | 50.63 | ^{(a)} | 17,054 | 18,518 | Dungaliyo | 10 | 96241 |
| 75.01.04 | Tibawa | 151.29 | 37,707 | 40,798 | 44,342 | Isimu Selatan | 16 | 96231 |
| 75.01.16 | Pulubala | 232.39 | 22,290 | 24,752 | 26,950 | Pulubala | 11 | 96161 - 96172 |
| 75.01.09 | Boliyohuto | 59.92 | 24,257 | 16,836 | 18,433 | Sidomulyo | 13 | 96235 |
| 75.01.14 | Mootilango | 218.33 | 17,603 | 18,932 | 20,651 | Paris | 10 | 96150 - 96159 |
| 75.01.13 | Tolangohula | 181.01 | 21,339 | 22,728 | 24,484 | Suka Makmur | 15 | 96222 |
| 75.01.21 | Asparaga | 420.81 | 12,308 | 13,070 | 14,198 | Karya Indah | 10 | 96221 |
| 75.01.23 | Bilato | 119.04 | ^{(b)} | 9,732 | 10,634 | Totopo | 10 | 96234 |
| 75.01.01 | Limboto | 87.11 | 45,625 | 49,796 | 54,841 | Kayu Bulan | 14 ^{(c)} | 96211 - 96219 |
| 75.01.17 | Limboto Barat (West Limboto) | 101.50 | 23,477 | 25,353 | 27,164 | Huidu | 10 | 96215 - 96217 |
| 75.01.02 | Telaga | 33.87 | 20,703 | 23,240 | 24,810 | Hulawa | 9 | 96181 |
| 75.01.10 | Telaga Biru | 135.57 | 26,532 | 29,999 | 34,217 | Tuladengi | 15 | 96183 |
| 75.01.18 | Tilango ^{(d)} | 8.62 | 12,865 | 16,345 | 17,225 | Tilote | 8 | 96182 |
| 75.01.22 | Talaga Jaya ^{(d)} | 10.14 | 10,416 | 12,625 | 13,875 | Luwoo | 5 | 96184 |
| | Totals | 2,188.82 | 355,988 | 393,107 | 428,370 | Limboto | 205 | |

Notes: (a) the 2010 population of the new Dungaliyo District is included in the figure for the existing Bongomeme District, from which it was cut out.
(b) the 2010 population of the new Bilato District is included in the figure for the existing Boliyohuto District, from which it was cut out.
(c) all 14 are kelurahan. (d) Tilango and Talaga Jaya Districts are western suburbs of Gorontalo city.

== Towns and villages ==
- Atinggola
- Potanga
