= List of districts of Gorontalo =

The province of Gorontalo in Indonesia is divided into 5 regencies (kabupaten) and one city (kota), which in turn are divided administratively into 77 districts, known as Kecamantan.

The districts of Gorontalo, with the regency or city each falls into, are as follows:

- Anggrek, Gorontalo Utara
- Asparaga, Gorontalo
- Atinggola, Gorontalo Utara
- Batudaa, Gorontalo
- Batudaa Pantai, Gorontalo
- Biau, Gorontalo Utara
- Bilato, Gorontalo
- Biluhu, Gorontalo
- Boliohuto, Gorontalo
- Bongomeme, Gorontalo
- Bone, Bone Bolango
- Bone Raya, Bone Bolango
- Bone Pantai, Bone Bolango
- Botumoita, Boalemo
- Botupingge, Bone Bolango
- Bulango Selatan, Bone Bolango
- Bulango Timur, Bone Bolango
- Bulango Ulu, Bone Bolango
- Bulango Utara, Bone Bolango
- Bulawa, Bone Bolango
- Buntulia, Pohuwato
- Dengilo, Pohuwato
- Dulupi, Boalemo
- Dumbo Raya, Gorontalo City (kota)
- Duhiadaa, Pohuwato
- Dungaliyo, Gorontalo
- Dungingi, Gorontalo City (kota)
- Gentuma Raya, Gorontalo Utara
- Hulonthalangi, Gorontalo City (kota)
- Jomilito, Gorontalo Utara
- Kabila, Bone Bolango
- Kabila Bone, Bone Bolango
- Kota Barat, Gorontalo City (kota)
- Kota Selatan, Gorontalo City (kota)
- Kota Tengah, Gorontalo City (kota)
- Kota Timur, Gorontalo City (kota)
- Kota Utara, Gorontalo City (kota)
- Kwandang, Gorontalo Utara
- Lemito, Pohuwato
- Limboto, Gorontalo
- Limboto Barat, Gorontalo
- Mananggu, Boalemo
- Marisa, Pohuwato
- Monano, Gorontalo Utara
- Mootilango, Gorontalo
- Paguat, Pohuwato
- Paguyaman, Boalemo
- Paguyaman Pantai, Boalemo
- Patilanggio, Pohuwato
- Pinogu, Bone Bolango
- Ponelo Kepulauan, Gorontalo Utara
- Popayato, Pohuwato
- Popayato Barat, Pohuwato
- Popayato Timur, Pohuwato
- Pulubala, Gorontalo
- Randangan, Pohuwato
- Sipatana, Gorontalo City (kota)
- Sumalata, Gorontalo Utara
- Sumalata Timur, Gorontalo Utara
- Suwawa, Bone Bolango
- Suwawa Selatan, Bone Bolango
- Suwawa Tengah, Bone Bolango
- Suwawa Timur, Bone Bolango
- Tabongo, Gorontalo
- Talaga Jaya, Gorontalo
- Taluditi, Pohuwato
- Tapa, Bone Bolango
- Telaga, Gorontalo
- Telaga Biru, Gorontalo
- Tibawa, Gorontalo
- Tilamuta, Boalemo
- Tilango, Gorontalo
- Tilongkabila, Bone Bolango
- Tolangohula, Gorontalo
- Tolinggula, Gorontalo Utara
- Wanggarasi, Pohuwato
- Wonosari, Boalemo
