= Engineering education =

Educational activity of teaching knowledge and principles of engineering

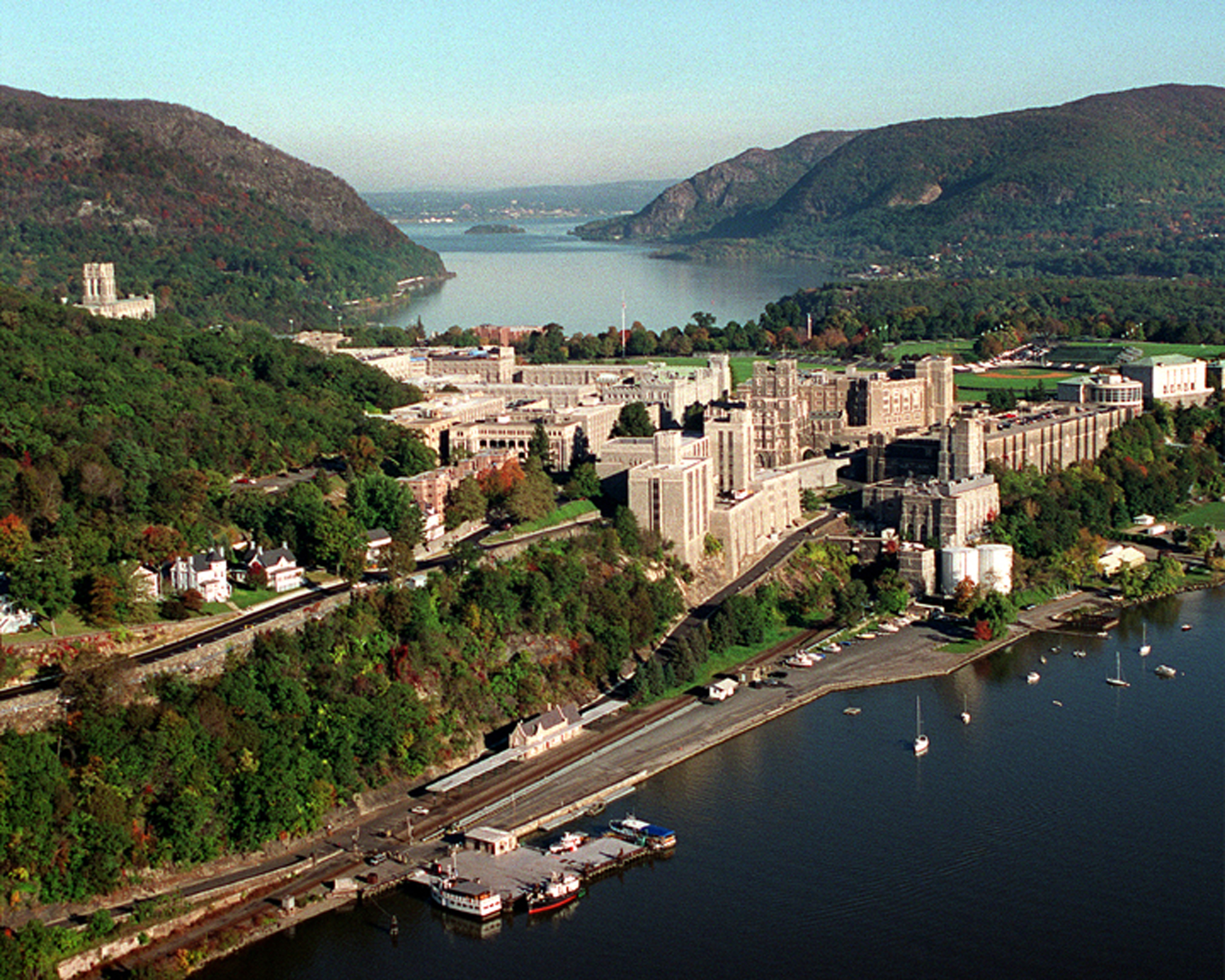
The United States Military Academy in West Point, New York, developed the first engineering education program in the United States in 1817.

Engineering education is the activity of teaching knowledge and principles to the professional practice of engineering. It includes an initial education (Dip.Eng.) and (B.Eng.) or (M.Eng.), and any advanced education and specializations that follow. Engineering education is typically accompanied by additional postgraduate examinations and supervised training as the requirements for a professional engineering license. The length of education, and training to qualify as a basic professional engineer, is typically five years, with 15–20 years for an engineer who takes responsibility for major projects.

Science, technology, engineering, and mathematics (STEM) education in primary and secondary schools often serves as the foundation for engineering education at the university level. In the United States, engineering education is a part of the STEM initiative in public schools. Service-learning in engineering education is gaining popularity within the variety of disciplinary focuses within engineering education including chemical engineering, civil engineering, mechanical engineering, industrial engineering, computer engineering, electrical engineering, architectural engineering, and other engineering education. The field of academic inquiry regarding the education of engineers is called engineering education research.

== Africa ==
=== Ghana ===
Ghana's engineering profession is regulated by the Ghana Institution of Engineers (GhIE), an autonomous body established in 1968. Its authority stems from the Engineering Council Act 2011 (Act 819) and the Professional Bodies Registration Decree NRCD143 of 1973.

=== Kenya ===
Engineering training in Kenya is typically provided by the universities. Registration of engineers is governed by the Engineers Registration Act. A candidate stands to qualify as a registered engineer, R.Eng., if they are a holder of a minimum of four years of post-secondary Engineering Education and a minimum of three years of postgraduate work experience.

All registrations are undertaken by the Engineers Registration Board which is a statutory body established through an Act of the Kenyan Parliament in 1969. A minor revision was done in 1992 to accommodate Technician Engineer grade. The board has been given the responsibility of regulating the activities and conduct of Practicing Engineers in the Republic of Kenya in accordance with the functions and powers conferred upon it by the Act. Under CAP 530 of the Laws of Kenya, it is illegal for an engineer to practice or call themself an engineer if not registered with the board. Registration with the board is thus a license to practice engineering in Kenya.

=== Nigeria ===
Engineering training is provided by universities subject to accreditation by the National Universities Commission (NUC) and the Council for Regulation of Engineering in Nigeria (COREN). A candidate can be registered as an engineer after completion of a five-year bachelor's degree (or equivalent) and four years of post-graduate work experience. Previously, postgraduate education in engineering could be counted towards work experience. A candidate trained through a polytechnic may also be certified as a registered engineer on completion of a two-year Ordinary National Diploma (OND), a two-year Higher National Diploma (HND) and a post-graduate diploma (PGD) all in the same engineering discipline with two years of work experience after the PGD. Registration allows use of the protected title, registered Engineer (Engr). An alternative version, Registered Engineer (R. Eng) is also used although it is not formally recognized by COREN. Any person not registered as an engineer may not use any title that implies that they are registered Engineers. It is illegal to carry out engineering practice without a COREN registration. All unregistered engineers must work under supervision of an Engr.

COREN also recognizes other cadres of engineering work- technologists, technicians and craftsmen. Technologists and technicians are trained by polytechnics while craftsmen are trained by technical colleges. Technologists can become registered Engineering Technologists (Eng Tech) on completion of a two-year Ordinary National Diploma (OND), a two-year Higher National Diploma (HND) and three years of post-graduate work experience. A technician can be certified as a registered Engineering Technician (Tech) after completion of a two-year OND and two-years of post-graduate work experience. A craftsman can become a registered Engineering Craftsman after passing the technical exam of the West African Examinations Council or National Business and Technical Examinations Board or a Trade Test Grade 1 from the Federal Ministry of Labour. In addition, two years of work experience are required.

=== South Africa ===
Engineering training in South Africa is typically provided by the universities, universities of technology and colleges for Technical and Vocational Education and Training (previously Further Education and Training). The qualifications provided by these institutions must have an Engineering Council of South Africa (ECSA) accreditation for the qualification for graduates and diplomats of these institutions to be registered as Candidate Certificated Engineers, Candidate Engineers, Candidate Engineering Technologists and Candidate Engineering Technicians. There are many benefits to these attributes.

The academic training performed by the universities is typically in the form of a four-year BSc(Eng), BIng or BEng degree. For the degree to be accredited, the course material must conform to the ECSA Graduate Attributes (GA).

Professional Engineers (Pr Eng) are persons that are accredited by ECSA as engineering professionals. Legally, a Professional Engineer's sign off is required for any major project to be implemented, in order to ensure the safety and standards of the project. Professional Engineering Technologists (Pr Tech Eng) and Professional Engineering Technicians (Pr Techni Eng) are other members of the engineering team.

Professional Certificated Engineers (Pr Cert Eng) are people who hold one of seven Government Certificates of Competency and who have been registered by ECSA as engineering professionals.

The categories of professionals are differentiated by the degree of complexity of work carried out, where Professional Engineers are expected to solve complex engineering problems, Professional Engineering Technologists and Professional Certificated Engineers, broadly defined engineering problems and Professional Engineering Technicians, well-defined engineering problems.

=== Tanzania ===
Engineering training in Tanzania is typically provided by various universities and technical institutions in the country. Graduate engineers are registered by the Engineers Registration Board (ERB) after undergoing three years of practical training. A candidate stands to qualify as a professional engineer, P.Eng., if they are a holder of a minimum four years post-secondary Engineering Education and a minimum of three years of postgraduate work experience. Engineers Registration Board is a statutory body established through an Act of the Tanzanian Parliament in 1968. Minor revision was done in 1997 to address the issue of engineering professional excellence in the country.

The board has been given the responsibility of regulating the activities and conduct of Practicing Engineers in the United Republic of Tanzania in accordance with the functions and powers conferred upon it by the Act. According to Tanzania Laws, it is illegal for an engineer to practice or call themself an engineer if not registered with the board. Registration with the board is thus a license to practice engineering in United Republic of Tanzania.

== Asia ==
=== Bangladesh ===
To be educated in engineering education in Bangladesh, one has to study for a long time. This length of time is required because a fashion engineer in Bangladesh has to acquire technical education from an early age.

- Technical School & College Engineer means skilled in technical education. And to be proficient in technical education, you have to be educated in technical education from childhood. So you have to pass (2 years) Secondary and (2 years) Higher Secondary from Technical School & College under Bangladesh Technical Education Board.
- Polytechnic/University Polytechnics and universities mainly offer engineering degrees. After secondary and higher secondary, one can get admission in polytechnic & University. Polytechnic & university institutes offer 4-year (Dip.Engg.)and BSc.Engg degrees. Different types of engineering degrees in Diploma are Electrical Engineering, Civil Engineering, Computer Engineering, Electronic Engineering, Marine Engineering, Mechanical Engineering, etc.

=== Hong Kong ===
In Hong Kong, engineering degree programmes (4-year bachelor's degree) are offered by public universities funded by the University Grant Committee (UGC). There are 94 UGC-funded programmes in engineering and technology offered by City University of Hong Kong, the Chinese University of Hong Kong, the Hong Kong Polytechnic University, the Hong Kong University of Science and Technology, and the University of Hong Kong. For example, the Faculty of Engineering of the University of Hong Kong (HKU) has five departments providing undergraduate, postgraduate and research degrees in civil engineering, Computer Science, Electrical and Electronic Engineering, Industrial and Manufacturing Systems Engineering, as well as Mechanical Engineering. All programmes of Bachelor of Engineering under the Joint University Programmes Admissions System (JUPAS) code 6963 being offered are accredited by the Hong Kong Institution of Engineers (HKIE). With that standing, the professional qualification of HKU engineering graduates is mutually recognized by most countries, such as the United States, Australia, Canada, Japan, Korea, New Zealand, Singapore and South Africa. Applicants with other local / international /national qualifications such as GCE A-level, International Baccalaureate (IB) or SAT can apply through the Non-JUPAS Route.

The Hong Kong Institution of Engineers (the HKIE) accredits individual engineering degree programmes. The process of professional accreditation also considers the appropriate Faculty in terms of its overall philosophy, objectives and resources. The professional accreditation of engineering degree programmes in the universities is normally initiated by a university issuing an invitation to the HKIE's Accreditation Board to carry out appropriate accreditation exercises.

To become a professional engineer, senior secondary (Form 4 to Form 6) school students start by choosing science and technology related subjects, while at least passing English and Mathematics in the Hong Kong Diploma of Secondary Education examinations. Secondary school graduates have to enroll in an HKIE accredited engineering programme, join the universities' engineering students society and join the HKIE as a student member. After completing a bachelor's degree in engineering, graduates undergo two to three years of engineering graduate training and gaining another two to three years relevant working experience. Upon passing the Professional Assessment, the candidate will be conferred member by the HKIE, finally becoming a Professional Engineer. The engineering profession in Hong Kong has 21 engineering disciplines, namely Aircraft, Biomedical, Building, Building Services, Chemical, Civil Control, Automation & Instrumentation, Electrical, Electronics, Energy, Environmental, Fire, Gas, Geotechnical, Information, Logistics & Transportation, Manufacturing & Industrial, Marine & Naval Architecture, Materials, Mechanical, as well as Structural engineering.

In 2019, the Asian Society of Engineering Education (AsiaSEE) is founded in Hong Kong by Dr. Cecilia K.Y. Chan and over twenty founding members around Asia. AsiaSEE is the first Asian regional network of higher educational institutions leaders with commitment to improve engineering education. The vision of AsiaSEE is to be the trusted body in Asia to facilitate communications and cooperation in engineering education between members, institutions, industries, stakeholders and like-minded societies in the world. The mission of AsiaSEE is to contribute to the advancement and enhancement in engineering education via research and practice for the future generation.

QS World University Rankings by Subject 2019: Engineering and Technology: Hong Kong
Rank	University
18	The Hong Kong University of Science and Technology
35	The University of Hong Kong
57	The Chinese University of Hong Kong
70	Hong Kong Polytechnic University
79	City University of Hong Kong
451–500	Hong Kong Baptist University

=== Uzbekistan ===
- Turin Polytechnic University in Tashkent
- Tashkent State Technical University
- Tashkent Institute of Irrigation and Melioration
- Tashkent Automobile and Road Construction Institut

=== India ===
More than 5,000 universities and colleges offer engineering courses in India.

=== Indonesia ===
- Sepuluh Nopember Institute of Technology
- Bandung Institute of Technology
- Faculty of Engineering of Sebelas Maret University
- Faculty of Engineering of Andalas University
- Faculty of Engineering of Sultan Ageng Tirtayasa University
- Faculty of Engineering of University of Indonesia
- Faculty of Engineering of Gadjah Mada University
- Faculty of Engineering of Diponegoro University
- Faculty of Engineering of Universitas Negeri Padang
- Faculty of Engineering of Universitas Negeri Malang
- Faculty of Engineering of Hasanuddin University
- Faculty of Engineering of University of Surabaya

=== Malaysia ===
Activities on engineering education in Malaysia are spearheaded by the Society of Engineering Education Malaysia (SEEM). SEEM was established in 2008 and launched on 23 February 2009. The idea of establishing the Society of Engineering Education was initiated in April 2005 with the creating of a Pro-team Committee for SEEM. The objectives of this society are to contribute to the development of education in the fields of engineering education and science and technology, including teaching and learning, counseling, research, service and public relations.

- Universiti Teknologi Malaysia
- Centre For Engineering Education, CEE
- Universiti Tunku Abdul Rahman
- Tunku Abdul Rahman University College
- Southern University College
- Universiti Malaysia Pahang

=== Pakistan ===
In Pakistan, engineering education is accredited by the Pakistan Engineering Council, a statutory body, constituted under the PEC Act No. V of 1976 of the constitution of Pakistan and amended vide Ordinance No.XXIII of 2006, to regulate the engineering profession in the country. It aims to achieve rapid and sustainable growth in all national, economic and social fields. The council is responsible for maintaining realistic and internationally relevant standards of professional competence and ethics for engineers in the country. PEC interacts with the Government, both at the Federal and Provincial level by participating in Commissions, Committees and Advisory Bodies. PEC is a fully representative body of the engineering community in the country. PEC has a full signatory status with Washington Accord.

=== Philippines ===
The Professional Regulation Commission is the regulating body for engineers in the Philippines.

In the Philippines the Center for Innovation in Engineering Education (CIEE) at Batangas State University - The National Engineering University operates with a visionary goals to elevate the standard of engineering education in the country and to cultivate individuals equipped to lead in the dynamic global knowledge economy. With a strategic focus on fostering academic and industry leaders, CIEE acts as a nucleus, fostering collaborations among interdisciplinary experts. This collective synergy promotes a seamless exchange of knowledge and resources, bridging the gap between academia and industry. CIEE's multifaceted support spans from steering engineering curriculum development to achieving targeted advancements in research, teaching methodologies, and assessment pedagogies. Notably, the Center spearheads professional training initiatives, empowering capacity building not only within our institution but across Higher Education Institutions (HEIs). Integral to its mission, CIEE diligently cultivates and manages crucial industry partnerships, facilitating ongoing advancements in engineering education. Furthermore, the Center's commitment extends globally, evidenced by its orchestration of international conferences in engineering education and overseeing the publication of scholarly works, fostering widespread dissemination of pioneering ideas and research.

=== Taiwan ===
Engineering is one of the most popular majors among universities in Taiwan. The engineering degrees are over a quarter of the bachelor's degrees in Taiwan. Campuses include the National Taiwan University of Science and Technology.

== Europe ==
=== Austria ===
In Austria, similar to Germany, an engineering degree can be obtained from either universities or Fachhochschulen (universities of applied sciences). As in most of Europe, the education usually consists of a 3-year bachelor's degree and a 2-year master's degree.

A lower engineering degree is offered by Höheren Technische Lehranstalten, (HTL, Higher Technical Institute), a form of secondary college which reaches from grade 9 to 13. There are disciplines like civil engineering, electronics, information technology, etc.

In the 5th year of HTL, as in other secondary schools in Austria, there is a final exam, called Matura. Graduates obtain an Ingenieur engineering degree after three years of work in the studied field.

=== Bulgaria ===
The beginning of higher engineering education in Bulgaria is established by the Law for Establishing a Higher Technical School in Sofia in 1941. Only two years later however because of the bombs flying over Sofia, the school was evacuated in Lovech, and the regular classes were discontinued. The learning process started again in 1945 when the university became a State Polytechnic.

In Bulgaria, engineers are trained in the three basic degrees – bachelor, master and doctor. Since the Bologna declaration, students receive a bachelor's degree (4 years of studies), optionally followed by a master's degree (1 years of studies). The science and engineering courses include lecture and laboratory education. The main subjects to be studied are mathematics, physics, chemistry, electrical engineering, etc. The degree received after completing with a state exam or defense of a thesis. Absolvents are awarded with the Ing. title always put in front of one's name.

Some of engineering specialties are completely traditional, such as machine building, computer and software engineering, automation, electrical engineering, electronics. Newer specialties are engineering design, mechatronics, aviation engineering, industrial engineering.

The following technical universities prepare mainly engineers in Bulgaria:

- Technical University Sofia
- Technical University Varna
- Technical University Gabrovo
- University of Forestry
- University of Architecture, Civil Engineering and Geodesy
- University of Chemical Technology and Metallurgy Sofia
- Agricultural University Plovdiv
- University of Mining and Geology "St. Ivan Rilski"

The Bulgarian engineers are united in the Federation of Scientific and Technical Unions, established in 1949. It comprises 33 territorial and 19 national unions.

=== Denmark ===
In Denmark, the engineering degree is delivered by either universities or engineering colleges (e.g. Engineering College of Aarhus).

Students receive first a baccalaureate degree (3 years of studies) followed by a master's degree (1–2 years of studies) according to the principles of the Bologna declaration. The engineering doctorate degree is the PhD (additional 3 years of studies).

=== Finland ===
Finland's system is derived from Germany's system. Two kinds of universities are recognized, the universities and the universities of applied sciences.

Universities award typically 'Bachelor of Science in Technology' and 'Master of Science in Technology' degrees. Bachelor's degree is a three-year degree as master's degree is equivalent for two-year full-time studies. In Finnish the master's degree is called diplomi-insinööri, similarly as in Germany (Diplom-Ingenieur). The degrees are awarded by engineering schools or faculties in universities (in Aalto University, Oulu, Turku, Vaasa and Åbo Akademi University) or by separate universities of technology (Tampere UT and Lappeenranta UT). The degree is a scientific, theoretical taught master's degree. Master's thesis is important part of master's degree studies. Master's degree qualifies for further study into Licentiate or doctorate. Because of the Bologna process, the degree tekniikan kandidaatti ("Bachelor of Technology"), corresponding to three years of study into the master's degree, has been introduced.

The universities of applied sciences are regional universities that award 3.5-, to 4-year engineer degrees insinööri (amk). An engineer's degree is normally 240 ECTS. There are 20 universities of applied sciences in Finland with a wide range of disciplines. The aim of the degree is professional competency with an emphasis on practical problem solving in engineering. Normally the teaching language is Finnish but there are also universities with Swedish as language of instruction, and most universities of applied sciences offer some degrees in English, too. These universities also award a Master of Engineering degree, designed for engineers already involved in the working life with at least two years of professional experience.

=== France ===
In France, the engineering degree is mainly delivered by "Grandes Écoles d'Ingénieurs" (graduate schools of engineering) upon completion of 3 years of Master's studies. Many Écoles recruit undergraduate students from CPGE (two- or three-year high level program after the Baccalauréat), even though some of them include an integrated undergraduate cycle. Other students accessing these Grandes Ecoles may come from other horizons, such as DUT or BTS (technical two-year university degrees) or standard two-year university degrees. In all cases, recruitment is highly selective. Hence graduate engineers in France have studied a minimum of five years after the baccalaureate. Since 2013, the French engineering degree is recognized by the AACRAO as a Master of Science in engineering. To be able to deliver the engineering degree, an École Master 's curriculum has to be validated by the Commission des titres d'ingénieur (Commission of the Engineering Title). It is important for the external observer to note that the system in France is extremely demanding in its entrance requirements (numerus clausus, using student rank in exams as the only criterion), despite being almost free of tuition fees, and much stricter in regards to the academic level of applying students than many other systems. The system focuses solely on selecting students by their engineering fundamental disciplines (mathematics, physics) abilities rather than their financial ability to finance large tuition fees, thus enabling a wider population access to higher education. In fact, being a graduate engineer in France is considered as being near/at the top of the social/professional ladder. The engineering profession grew from the military and the nobility in the 18th century. Before the French Revolution, engineers were trained in schools for technical officers, like "École d'Arts et Métiers" (Arts et Métiers ParisTech) established in 1780. Then, other schools were created, for instance the École polytechnique and the Conservatoire national des arts et métiers which was established in 1794. Polytechnique is one of the grandes écoles that have traditionally prepared technocrats to lead French government and industry, and has been one of the most privileged routes into the elite divisions of the civil service known as the "grands corps de l'État".

Inside a French company the title of Ingénieur refers to a rank in qualification and is not restricted. Therefore, there are sometimes Ingénieurs des Ventes (Sales Engineers), Ingénieur Marketing, Ingénieur Bancaire (Banking Engineer), Ingénieur Recherche & Développement (R&D Engineer), etc.

=== Germany ===
In Germany, the term Ingenieur (engineer) is legally protected and may only be used by graduates of a university degree program in engineering. Such degrees are offered by universities (Universitäten), including Technische Universitäten (universities of technology) and Technische Hochschulen, or Fachhochschulen (universities of applied sciences).

Since the Bologna reforms, students receive a bachelor's degree (3–4 years of studies), optionally followed by a master's degree (1–2 years of studies). Prior to the country adopting the Bologna system, the first and only pre-doctorate degree received after completing engineering education at university was the German Diplomingenieur (Dipl.-Ing.). The engineering doctorate is the Doktoringenieur (Dr.-Ing.).

=== Italy ===
In Italy, the engineering degree and "engineer" title is delivered by polytechnic universities upon completion of 3 years of studies (laurea). Additional master's degree (2 years) and doctorate programs (3 years) provide the title of "dottore di ricerca in ingegneria". Students that started studies in polytechnic universities before 2005 (when Italy adopted the Bologna declaration) need to complete a 5-year program to get the engineer title. In this case the master's degree is obtained after 1 year of studies. Only people with an engineer title can be employed as "engineers". Still, some with competence and experience in an engineering field that do not have such a title, can still be employed to perform engineering tasks as "specialist", "assistant", "technologist" or "technician". But, only engineers can take legal responsibility and provide guarantee upon the work done by a team in their area of expertise. Sometimes a company working in this area, which temporarily does not have any employees with an engineer title must pay for an external service of an engineering audit to provide legal guarantee for their products or services.

=== The Netherlands ===
In the Netherlands there are two ways to study engineering, i.e. at the Dutch 'technical hogeschool', which is a professional school (equivalent to a university of applied sciences internationally) and awards a practically orientated degree with the pre-nominal ing. after four years study. Or at the university, which offers a more academically oriented degree with the pre-nominal ir. after five years study. Both are abbreviations of the title Ingenieur.

In 2002 when the Netherlands switched to the Bachelor-Master system. This is a consequence of the Bologna process. In this accord 29 European countries agreed to harmonize their higher education system and create a European higher education area. In this system the professional schools award bachelor's degrees like BEng or BASc after four years study. And the universities with engineering programs award the bachelor's degree BSc after the third year. A university bachelor is usually continuing his education for one or two more years to earn his master's degree MSc. Adjacent to these degrees, the old titles of the pre-populated system are still in use. A vocational bachelor may be admitted to a university master's degree program although often they are required to take additional courses.

=== Poland ===
In Poland after 3,5–4 years of technical studies, one gets inżynier degree (inż.), which corresponds to BSc or BEng After that, one can continue studies, and after 2 years of post-graduate programme (supplementary studies) can obtain additional MSc (or MEng) degree, called magister, mgr, and that time one has two degrees: magister inżynier, mgr inż. (literally: master engineer). The mgr degree formerly (until full adaptation of Bologna process by university) could be obtained in integrated 5 years BSc-MSc programme studies. Graduates having magister inżynier degree, can start 4 years doctorate studies (PhD), which require opening of doctoral proceedings (przewód doktorski), carrying out own research, passing some exams (e.g. foreign language, philosophy, economy, leading subjects), writing and defense of doctoral thesis. Some PhD students have also classes with undergraduate students (BSc, MSc). Graduate of doctorate studies of technical university holds scientific degree of doktor nauk technicznych, dr inż., (literally: "doctor of technical sciences") or other e.g. Doktor Nauk Chemicznych (lit. "doctor of chemical sciences").

=== Portugal ===
In Portugal, there are two paths to study engineering: the polytechnic and the university paths. In theory, but many times not so much in practice, the polytechnic path is more practical oriented, the university path being more research oriented.

In this system, the polytechnic institutes award a licenciatura (bachelor) in engineering degree after three years of study, that can be complemented by a mestrado (master) in engineering after two plus years of study.

Regarding the universities, they offer both engineering programs similar to those of the polytechnics (three years licenciatura plus two years mestrado) as mestrado integrados (integrated master's) in engineering programs. The mestrado integrado programs take five years of study to complete, awarding a licenciatura degree in engineering sciences after the first three years and a mestrado degree in engineering after the whole five years. Further, the universities also offer doutoramento (PhD) programs in engineering.

Being an holder of an academic degree in engineering is not enough to practice the profession of engineer and to have the legal right of the use of the title engenheiro (engineer) in Portugal. For that, it is necessary to be admitted and be a member of the Ordem dos Engenheiros (Portuguese institution of engineers). At the Ordem dos Engenheiros, an engineer is classified as an E1, E2 or E3 grade engineer, accordingly with the higher engineer degree he or she holds. Holders of the ancient pre-Bologna declaration five years licenciatura degrees in engineering are classified as E2 engineers.

=== Romania ===
In Romania, the engineering degree and "engineer" title is delivered by technology and polytechnics universities upon completion of 4 years of studies. Additional master's degree (2 years) and doctorate programs (4–5 years) provide the title of "doctor inginer". Students that started studies in polytechnic universities before 2005 (when Romania adopted the Bologna declaration) needed to complete a 5-year program to get the engineer title. In this case the master's degree is obtained after 1 year of studies. Only people with an engineer title can be employed as engineers. Still, some with competence and experience in an engineering field that do not have such a title, can still be employed to perform engineering tasks as "specialist", "assistant", "technologist" or "technician". But, only engineers can take legal responsibility and provide guarantee upon the work done by a team in their area of expertise. Sometimes a company working in this area, which temporarily does not have any employees with an engineer title must pay for an external service of an engineering audit to provide legal guarantee for their products or services.

=== Russia ===
Students in Soviet engineering institutes did not major in mechanical or electrical engineering... but instead of one of hundreds of subspecialties... [for example] The Commissariat of Heavy Industry insisted on separate engineers for oil-based paints and non-oil-based paints.

— Loren Graham, Proceedings, American Philosophical Society (vol. 140, No. 2, 1996)

Moscow School of Mathematics and Navigation was a first Russian educational institution founded by Peter the Great in 1701. It provided Russians with technical education for the first time and much of its curriculum was devoted to producing sailors, engineers, cartographers and bombardiers to support Russian expanding navy and army. Then in 1810, the Saint Petersburg Military engineering-technical university becomes the first engineering higher learning institution in the Russian Empire, after addition of officers classes and application of five-year term of teaching. So initially more rigorisms of standards and teaching terms became the traditional historical feature of the Russian engineering education in the 19th century.

=== Slovakia ===
In Slovakia, an engineer (inžinier) is considered to be a person holding master's degree in technical sciences or economics. Several technical and economic universities offer 4-5-year master study in the fields of chemistry, agriculture, material technology, computer science, electrical and mechanical engineering, nuclear physics and technology or economics. A bachelor's degree in similar field is prerequisite. Absolvents are awarded with the Ing. title always put in front of one's name; eventual follow-up doctoral study is offered both by universities and some institutes of the Slovak Academy of Sciences.

=== Spain ===
In Spain, the engineering degree is delivered by universities in Engineering Schools, called "Escuelas de Ingeniería". Like with any other degree in Spain, students need to pass a series of examinations based on Bachillerato's subjects (Selectividad), select their bachelor's degree, and their marks determine whether they are access the degree they want or not.

Students receive first a grado degree (4 years of studies) followed by a master's degree (1–2 years of studies) according to the principles of the Bologna declaration, though traditionally, the degree received after completing an engineering education is the Spanish title of "Ingeniero". Using the title "Ingeniero" is legally regulated and limited to the according academic graduates.

=== Sweden ===
An institution offering engineering education is called "teknisk högskola" (institute of technology). These schools primarily offers five-year programmes resulting in the civilingenjör degree (not to be confused with the narrower English term "civil engineer"), internationally corresponding to a Master of Science in Engineering degree. These programmes typically offers a strong backing in the natural sciences, and the degree also opens up for doctoral (PHD) studies towards the degree "teknologie doktor". Civilingenjör programmes are offered in a broad range of fields: Engineering physics, Chemistry, Civil engineering, surveying, Industrial engineering and management, etc. There also are shorter three-year programmes called högskoleingenjör (Bachelor of Science in Engineering) that are typically more applied.

=== Turkey ===
In Turkey, engineering degrees range from a bachelor's degree in engineering (for a four-year period), to a master's degree (adding two years), and to a doctoral degree (usually four to five years).

The title is limited by law to people with an engineering degree, and the use of the title by others (even persons with much more work experience) is illegal.

The Union of Chambers of Turkish Engineers and Architects (UCTEA) was established in 1954 and separates engineers and architects to professional branches, with the condition of being within the framework of laws and regulations and in accordance with the present conditions, requirements and possibilities and to also establishes new Chambers for the group of engineers and architects, whose professional or working areas are similar or the same.

UCTEA is maintaining its activities with its 23 Chambers, 194 branches of its Chambers and 39 Provincial Coordination Councils. Approximately, graduates of 70 related academic disciplines in engineering, architecture and city planning are members of the Chambers of UCTEA.

=== United Kingdom ===
In the UK, like in the United States and Canada, most professional engineers are trained in universities, but some can start in a technical apprenticeship and either enroll in a university engineering degree later, or enroll in one of the Engineering Council UK programmes (level 6 – bachelor's and 7 – master's) administered by the City and Guilds of London Institute. A recent trend has seen the rise of both bachelor's and master's degree higher engineering apprenticeships. All accredited engineering courses and apprenticeships are assessed and approved by the various professional engineering institutions reflecting the subject by engineering discipline covered; IMechE, IET, BCS, ICE, IStructE etc. Many of these institutions date back to the 19th century, and have previously administered their own engineering examination programmes. They have become globally renowned as premier learned societies.

The degree then counts in part to qualifying as a Chartered Engineer after a period (usually 4–8 years beyond the first degree) of structured professional practice, professional practice peer review and, if required, further exams to then become a corporate member of the relevant professional body. The term 'Chartered Engineer' is regulated by Royal Assent and its use is restricted only to those registered; the awarding of this status is devolved to the professional institutions by the Engineering Council.

In the UK (except Scotland), most engineering courses take three years for an undergraduate bachelors (BEng) and four years for an undergraduate master's. Students who read a four-year engineering course are awarded a Masters of Engineering (as opposed to Masters of Science in Engineering) Some universities allow a student to opt out after one year before completion of the programme and receive a Higher National Diploma if a student has successfully completed the second year, or a Higher National Certificate if only successfully completed year one. Many courses also include an option of a year in industry, which is usually a year before completion. Students who opt for this are awarded a 'sandwich degree'.

BEng graduates may be registered as an "Incorporated Engineer" by the Engineering Council after a period of structured professional practice, professional practice peer review and, if required, further exams to then become a member of the relevant professional body. Again, the term 'Incorporated Engineer' is regulated by Royal Assent and its use is restricted only to those registered; the awarding of this status is devolved to the professional institutions by the Engineering Council.

Unlike the US and Canada, engineers do not require a licence to practice the profession in the UK. In the UK, the term "engineer" can be applied to non-degree vocations such as technologists, technicians, draftsmen, machinists, mechanics, plumbers, electricians, repair people, semi-skilled and even unskilled occupations.

In recent developments by government and industry, to address the growing skills deficit in many fields of UK engineering, there has been a strong emphasis placed on dealing with engineering in school and providing students with positive role models from a young age.

== Middle East ==
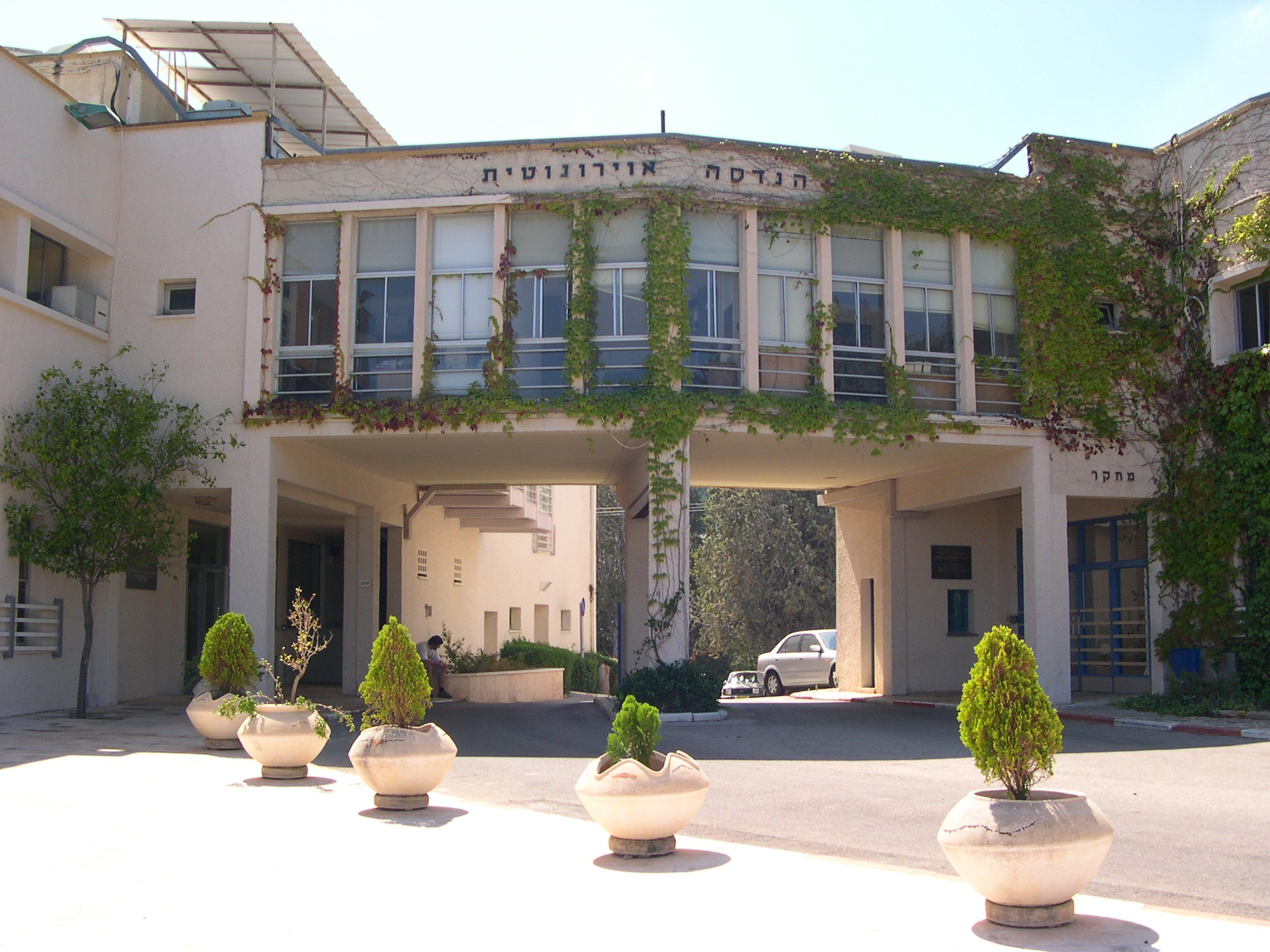
Aerospace Engineering Faculty in the Technion

=== Israel ===
In Israel, several universities and colleges provide engineering degrees. These universities include the Technion Institute of Technology, Tel Aviv University, Bar Ilan University, Ben Gurion University, the Hebrew University of Jerusalem, among others.

== North America ==
=== Canada ===
Engineering degree education in Canada is highly regulated by the Canadian Council of Professional Engineers (Engineers Canada) and its Canadian Engineering Accreditation Board (CEAB). In Canada, there are 43 institutions offering 278 engineering accredited programs delivering a bachelor's degree after a term of 4 years. Many schools also offer graduate level degrees in the applied sciences. Accreditation means that students who successfully complete the accredited program will have received sufficient engineering knowledge in order to meet the knowledge requirements of licensure as a Professional Engineer. Alternately, Canadian graduates of unaccredited 3-year diploma, BSc, BTech, or BEng programs can qualify for professional license by association examinations. Some of the schools include: Concordia University, École de technologie supérieure, École Polytechnique de Montréal, University of Toronto, University of Manitoba, University of Saskatchewan, University of Victoria, University of Calgary, University of Alberta, University of British Columbia, McGill University, Dalhousie University, Toronto Metropolitan University, York University, University of Regina, Carleton University, McMaster University, University of Ottawa, Queen's University, University of New Brunswick, UOIT, University of Waterloo, University of Guelph, University of Windsor, Memorial University of Newfoundland, and Royal Military College of Canada. Every university offering engineering degrees in Canada needs to be accredited by the CEAB (Canadian Engineering Accreditation Board), thus ensuring high standards are enforced at all universities. Engineering degrees in Canada are distinct from degrees in engineering technology which are more applied degrees or diplomas. An engineering education in Canada can culminate by qualifying as a professional engineer (P.Eng.) licensee.

=== Mexico ===
In the case of Mexico, education in the engineering field could be taken from public and private universities. Both types of colleges and universities can confer degrees of BEng, BSc, MEng, MSc and PhD through the presentation and dissertation of a thesis or other kind of requirements such as technical reports and knowledge exams among others.

The first University in Mexico to offers degrees in some engineering fields was the Royal and Pontifical University of Mexico, established under the Spanish rule; the degrees offered included Mines Engineering and Physical Mathematical state-of-the-art knowledge from Europe.

Then came the 19th century and lack of political stability. The universities founded under Spanish rule were closed and reopened and the Engineering teaching tradition was lost; the University of Mexico, University of Guadalajara and University of Mérida suffered this. Then the liberal rule created the Arts and Handcraft schools were opened without the same success as the universities. In the 20th century and with the success of the Mexican Revolution some of the old colleges were reopened and the old Arts and Handcraft schools were joined to the new universities. In 1936 the National Polytechnic Institute of Mexico was created as an educational alternative for workers' sons and their families. A short time later the Regional Institutes of Technology were founded as a branch of the Polytechnic Institute in a few states of the republic, though most of them do not have any university in their own territory.

Right now the Regional Institutes of Technology have been merged into one single entity labeled as Mexican National Technological Institute. The National Polytechnic Institute is the ensign university of the Mexican federal government on engineering education.

=== United States ===
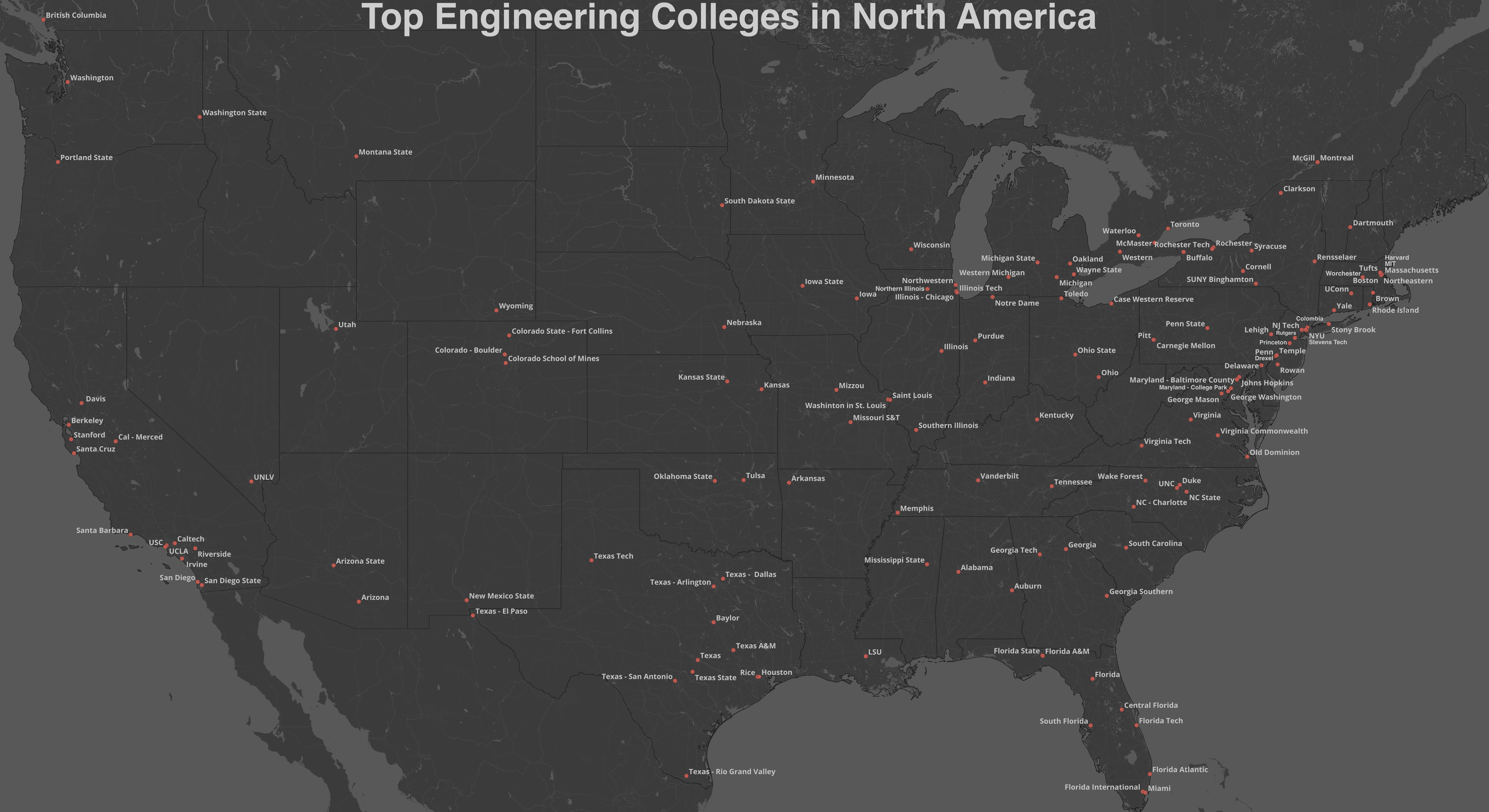
Top Engineering Colleges in North America

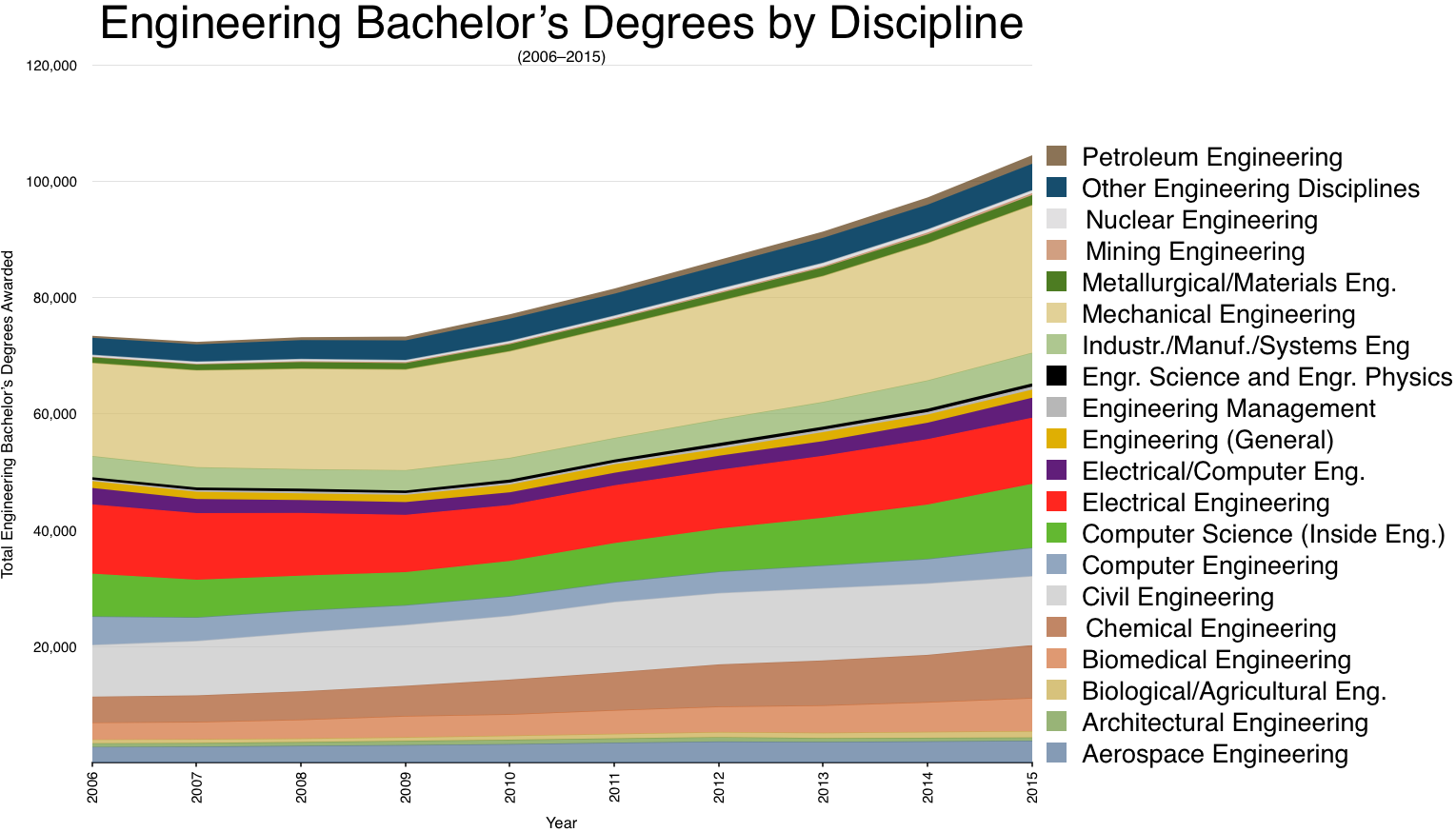
Engineering bachelor's degrees by discipline (2006–2015)

The first professional degree in engineering is a bachelor's degree with few exceptions. Interest in engineering has grown since 1999; the number of bachelor's degrees issued has increased by 20%. Most bachelor's degree engineering programs are four years long and require about two years of core courses followed by two years of specialized discipline specific courses. This is where a typical engineering student would learn mathematics (single- and multi-variable calculus and elementary differential equations), general chemistry, English composition, general and modern physics, computer science (typically programming), and introductory engineering in several areas that are required for a satisfactory engineering background and to be successful in their program of choice. Several courses in social sciences or humanities are often also required, but are commonly elective courses from a broad choice. Required common engineering courses typically include engineering drawing/computer-aided-design, materials engineering, statics and dynamics, strength of materials, basic circuits, thermodynamics, fluid mechanics, and perhaps some systems or industrial engineering. The science and engineering courses include lecture and laboratory education, either in the same course(s) or in separate courses. However, some professors and educators believe that engineering programs should change to focus more on professional engineering practice, and engineering courses should be taught more by professional engineering practitioners and not by engineering researchers.

Many engineering degree programs admit students directly to a specialization as a first-year, but those which don't often require students to decide on a specialization by the end of the first or second year of study. Specializations often include architectural engineering, civil engineering (including structural engineering), mechanical engineering, electrical engineering (often including computer engineering), chemical engineering, nuclear engineering, biological engineering, industrial engineering, aerospace engineering, materials engineering (including metallurgical engineering), agricultural engineering, and many other specializations. After choosing a specialization, an engineering student will begin to take classes that will build on the fundamentals and gain their specialized knowledge and skills. Toward the end of their undergraduate education, engineering students often undertake an open-ended design or other special project specific to their field.

It is common for University students who are studying engineering to partake in different forms of career development during their undergraduate studies. These often take the form of paid internships, cooperative education programs (also referred to as "co-ops"), research experiences, or service learning. These types of experiences may be facilitated by the students' universities, or sought out by the students independently.

==== Internships ====
Engineering internships are typically pursued by undergraduate students during the summer recess between the Spring and Fall semesters of the standard semester-based academic cycle (although some US universities abide by a 'quarter' or 'trimester' cycle). These internships usually have a duration of 8–12 weeks and may be part-time or full-time as well as paid or unpaid depending on the company; sometimes, students receive academic credit as an alternative or in addition to a wage. Shorter duration full-time internships over winter and other breaks are often available too, especially for those who have completed summer internships with the same firm.

Internships are offered as temporary positions by engineering companies, and are often competitive in certain fields. They provide a way for companies to recruit and get familiar with individual students as potential full-time employment after graduation. Engineering internships also have numerous benefits for participating students. They provide hands-on learning outside of the classroom as well as an opportunity for the student to discover if their current choice of engineering discipline is appropriate based on their level of enjoyment of their internship role. Additionally, research and internship experiences have been shown to have a positive effect on engineering task self-efficacy (ETSE), a measure of a students' perception of their ability to perform engineering functions and related tasks. It is also considered advantageous to have internship or co-op experience before completion of undergraduate studies, as students who have practical engineering experience are considered to be more attractive to engineering employers.

==== Cooperative Education Programs ====
Cooperative Education Programs (often referred to as 'co-ops') are similar to internships insofar as they are employment opportunities offered to undergraduate students by engineering employers; however, they are intended to take place concurrently with the students' academic studies. Co-ops are sometimes part-time roles that are ongoing throughout the academic semester, with the student expected to invest between 10 and 30 hours a week depending on the severity of their course load. Some American universities, such as Northeastern University and Drexel University, incorporate co-ops into their students' plan of study in the form of alternating semesters of full-time work and full-time classes; these programs typically take an additional year to complete compared to most 4-year undergraduate engineering programs in the US, even though Northeastern currently has a 4-year undergraduate program that integrates full-time co-ops with full-time studies. Co-ops are considered to be a valuable form of professional development, and may be undertaken by students who are looking to bolster their resumes with hopes of securing better salary offers when looking to secure their first job.

==== Licensing ====
After formal education, the engineer will often enter an internship or engineer in training status for approximately four years. To achieve Engineering Intern (E.I.) or Engineer-in-Training (EIT) status, an individual must be the recipient of an engineering degree from an institution accredited by the Engineering Accreditation Commission (EAC) of the ABET, formerly the Accreditation Board for Engineering and Technology, Inc., as well as pass the Fundamentals of Engineering Exam (often abbreviated to the 'FE Exam'). The FE Exam is offered by the National Council for Examiners for Engineering and Surveying (NCEES) for the following disciplines: Mechanical Engineering, Civil Engineering, Industrial & Systems Engineering, Chemical Engineering, Electrical & Computer Engineering, Environmental Engineering, or Other Disciplines (also referred to as "General Engineering"). The FE Exam is held at remote testing locations four times throughout the year and can be taken by college graduates as well as current college students. After successfully passing the Fundamentals of Engineering Exam and receiving an ABET-accredited engineering degree, an aspiring engineer may apply for engineer-in-training status with their state's licensing board. If granted, they may use the suffix E.I.T. to denote their status as an engineer-in-training.

After that time, the engineer in training can decide whether or not to take a state licensing test to make them a Professional Engineer. The licensing process varies state-by-state, but generally they require the engineer-in-training to possess four years of verifiable work experience in their engineering field, as well as successfully pass the NCEES Principles and Practice of Engineering (PE) Exam for their engineering discipline. After successful completion of that test, the Professional engineer can place the suffix P.E. after their name signifying that they are now a Professional Engineer and they can affix their P.E. seal to drawings and reports, for example. They can also serve as expert witnesses in their areas of expertise. Achieving the status of ' Professional Engineer is one of the highest levels of achievement one can attain in the engineering industry. Engineers with this status are generally highly sought after by employers, especially in the field of Civil Engineering.

There are also graduate degree options for an engineer. Many engineers decide to complete a master's degree in some field of engineering or business administration or get education in law, medicine, or other field.

Two types of doctorate are available also, the traditional PhD or the Doctor of Engineering. The PhD focuses on research and academic excellence, whereas the doctor of engineering focuses on practical engineering. The education requirements are the same for both degrees; however, the dissertation required is different. The PhD also requires the standard research problem, where the doctor of engineering focuses on a practical dissertation.

In present undergraduate engineering education, the emphasis on linear systems develops a way of thinking that dismisses nonlinear dynamics as spurious oscillations. The linear systems approach oversimplifies the dynamics of nonlinear systems. Hence, the undergraduate students and teachers should recognize the educational value of chaotic dynamics. Practicing engineers will also have more insight of nonlinear circuits and systems by having an exposure to chaotic phenomena.

After graduation, continuing education courses may be needed to keep a government-issued professional engineer (PE) license valid, to keep skills fresh, to expand skills, or to keep up with new technology.

== Caribbean ==
=== Trinidad and Tobago ===
Engineering degree education in Trinidad and Tobago is not regulated by the Board of Professional Engineers of Trinidad and Tobago (BOETT) or the location Engineering Association (APETT). Professional Engineers registed with BOETT are given the credentials "R.Eng.".

== South America ==
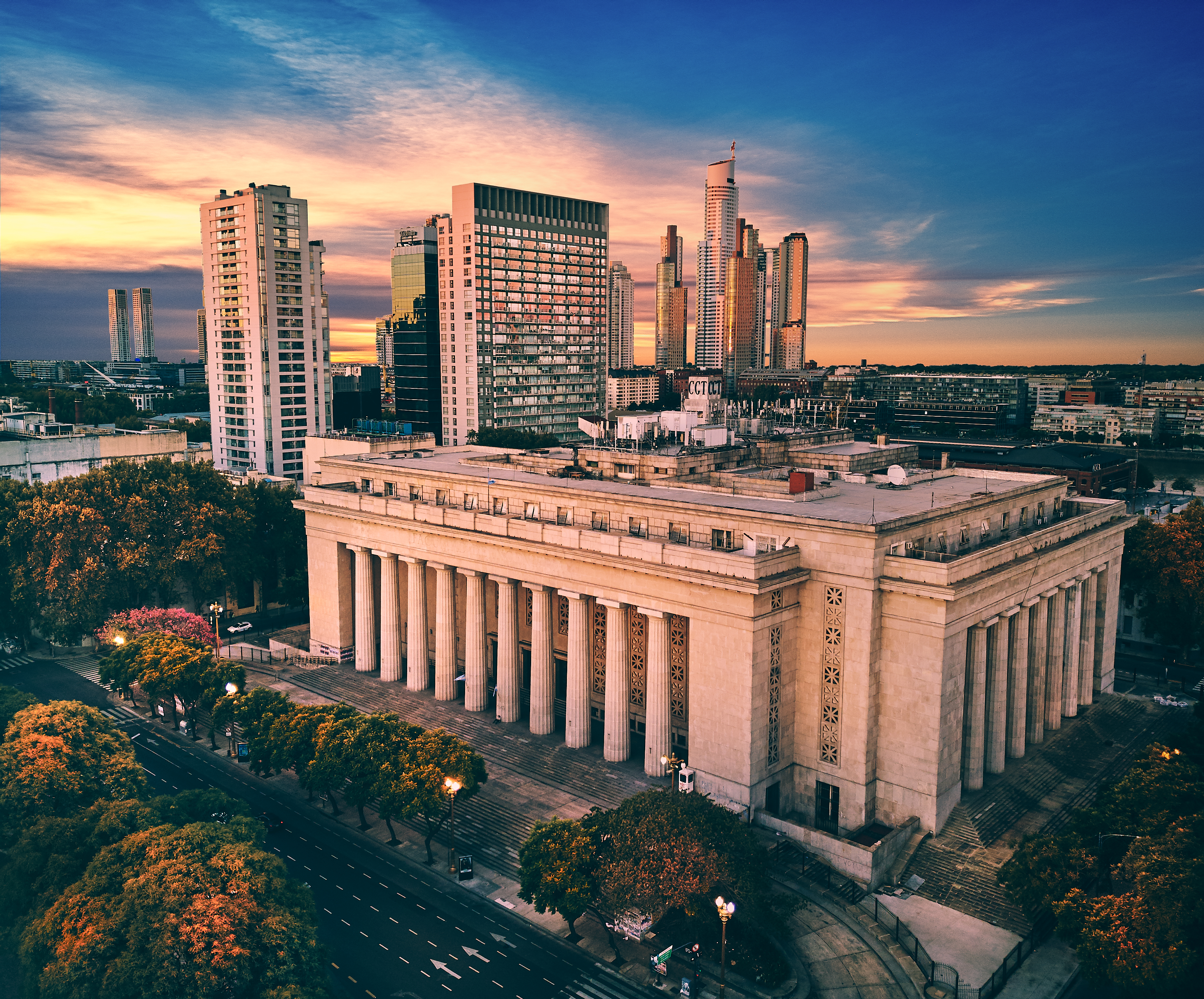
Faculty of Engineering of the University of Buenos Aires

=== Argentina ===
Engineering education programs at universities in Argentina span a variety of disciplines and typically require five–six years of studies to complete. Most degree programs begin with foundational courses in mathematics, statistics, and the physical sciences during the first and second years, then move on to courses specific to the students' plan of study. After receiving a degree, an engineering student will go on to complete an external evaluation in order to become accredited as an engineer.

There are many universities and technical schools across Argentina that offer degree programs in engineering education. The National Technological University (Universidad Tecnológica Nacional, UTN) is recognized as one of the best engineering institutions in the country, with degrees in the following disciplines offered across its 33 campuses:

- Aeronautical Engineering
- Civil Engineering
- Electrical Engineering
- Electronics Engineering
- Electro-mechanical Engineering
- Automotive Engineering
- Information Systems Engineering
- Railway Engineering
- Mechanical Engineering
- Metallurgical Engineering
- Naval Engineering
- Fisheries Engineering
- Chemical Engineering
- Textile Engineering

Outlined in the Argentinian Law 'Ley de Educacion Superior No. 24521' is the requirement for all universities to include a compulsory external evaluation for accreditation of certain professions, such as Law, Medicine, and Engineering, which are also strictly governed by other laws. Accreditation of engineers in Argentina is under the authority of the CONEAU (Comision Nacional de Evaluación y Acreditación Universitaria 1997), which performs the functions of coordinating and executing external evaluations and accrediting graduate and post-graduate university studies in the field of engineering.

=== Brazil ===
In Brazil, education in engineering is offered by both public and private institutions. A degree in engineering requires five to six years of studies, comprising the core courses, specific subjects, an internship and a Course Completion Paper.

Due to the nature of college admissions in Brazil, most students have to declare their major before entering college. This said, the first two years of a degree in engineering consist mostly of the core courses (calculus, physics, programming, etc.) along with a few specific subjects as well as some courses in humanities. After this period, some institutions offer specializations within the different fields of engineering (i.e. a student majoring in electrical engineering can choose to specialize in electronics or telecommunications) although most institutions balance their workload in order to give the students a consistent knowledge of every specialization.

Towards the end of their undergraduate education, students are required to develop the Course Completion Paper under the guidance of an adviser to be presented to and graded by a number of professors. In some institutions, students are also required to pursue an internship (the amount of time depends on the institution).

In order to pursue a career in engineering, graduates must first register with and abide by the rules of the Regional Counsel of Engineering and Agronomy of their state, a regional representative of the Federal Counsel of Engineering and Agronomy, a certification board for engineers, agronomists, geologists and other professionals of the applied sciences.

== See also ==
- List of engineering schools
- Education and training of electrical and electronics engineers
- Education for Chemical Engineers
- Engineering education research
- Engineer's degree
- Global Engineering Education
- Institute of technology
- Problem-based learning
- Project-based learning
