= List of medical schools in Indonesia =

This is a list of medical schools located in Indonesia. As of April 2026, there are currently 155 registered institutes of higher education that run medical schools all over Indonesia. These provinces, include South Papua, central papua, Highland Papua, and West Papua, does not have any medical school program on their own province.

As of 2026, there are more than 10 new medical schools opened to adjunct the need of physicians across Indonesia.

== Medical School Rank ==
The top seven medical schools in Indonesia, as of the year 2025 based on the QS World University Rankings:

1. Faculty of Medicine University of Indonesia, Jakarta
2. Faculty of Medicine Universitas Airlangga, Surabaya
3. Faculty of Medicine Gadjah Mada University, Yogyakarta
4. Faculty of Medicine Universitas Padjadjaran, Bandung
5. Faculty of Medicine Diponegoro University, Semarang
6. Faculty of Medicine Universitas Brawijaya, Malang
7. Faculty of Medicine Universitas Hasanuddin, Makassar

== Aceh ==
- Universitas Syiah Kuala, Banda Aceh
- Universitas Malikusalleh, Lhokseumawe
- Universitas Abulyatama, Aceh Besar
- Universitas Almuslim, Bireuen

== North Sumatra ==
- Universitas Sumatera Utara, Medan
- Universitas Prima Indonesia, Medan
- Universitas Methodist Indonesia, Medan
- Universitas Islam Sumatera Utara, Medan
- Universitas Muhammadiyah Sumatera Utara, Medan
- Universitas HKBP Nommensen, Medan
- Institut Kesehatan Helvetia, Deli serdang
- Institut Kesehatan Medistra, Lubuk Pakam
- Institut Kesehatan Deli Husada Deli Tua, Deli Serdang
- Universitas Imelda, Medan
- Universitas Negeri Medan, Medan

== Riau ==
- Universitas Riau , Pekanbaru
- Universitas Abdurrab, Pekanbaru
- Universitas Prima Indonesia Kampus Pekanbaru, Pekanbaru
- Universitas Muhammadiyah Riau, Pekanbaru
- Universitas Awal Bros, Pekanbaru

== West Sumatra ==
- Universitas Andalas, Padang
- Universitas Baiturrahmah, Padang
- Universitas Negeri Padang, Padang
- Universitas Prima Nusantara, Bukittinggi

== Riau Islands ==
- Universitas Batam, Batam
- Universitas Maritim Raja Ali Haji, Tanjung Pinang
- Universitas Internasional Batam, Batam
- Institut Kesehatan Mitra Bunda, Batam

== Jambi ==
- Universitas Jambi, Jambi
- Universitas Adiwangsa, Jambi
- Universitas Islam Negeri Sultan Thaha Saifuddin, Jambi

== Bengkulu ==
- Universitas Bengkulu, Bengkulu

== South Sumatra ==
- Universitas Sriwijaya, Palembang
- Universitas Muhammadiyah Palembang, Palembang
- Universitas Indo Global Mandiri, Palembang

== Bangka Belitung ==
- Universitas Bangka Belitung, Bangka

== Lampung ==
- Universitas Lampung, Bandar Lampung
- Universitas Malahayati, Bandar Lampung
- Universitas Aisyah Pringsewu, Pringsewu
- Universitas Muhammadiyah Metro, Metro City

== Banten ==
- Universitas Sultan Ageng Tirtayasa, Cilegon
- Universitas Pelita Harapan, Tangerang Regency

== Jakarta ==
- Universitas Katolik Indonesia Atma Jaya
- Unviersitas Tarumanagara
- Universitas Trisakti
- Universitas Yarsi
- University Indonesia
- Universitas Kristen Krida Wacana
- Universitas Kristen Indonesia
- Universitas Pembangunan Nasional Veteran Jakarta
- Universitas Muhammadiyah Jakarta
- Universitas Gunadarma
- Universitas Prof. Dr. Hamka
- Universitas Islam Negeri Syarif Hidayatullah Jakarta

== West Java ==
- Universitas Padjadjaran, Sumedang Regency
- Universitas Kristen Maranatha, Bandung
- Universitas Jenderal Achmad Yani, Cimahi
- Universitas Islam Bandung, Bandung
- Universitas Pasundan, Bandung
- Universitas Swadaya Gunung Jati, Cirebon
- Universitas Pertahanan Republik Indonesia, Bogor Regency
- Universitas IPB, Bogor
- Universitas Pendidikan Indonesia, Bandung
- Universitas Presiden, Bekasi Regency
- Universitas Katolik Parahyangan, Bandung

== Central Java ==
- Universitas Diponegoro, Semarang
- Universitas Sebelas Maret, Surakarta
- Universitas Jenderal Soedirman, Purwokerto
- Universitas Islam Sultan Agung, Semarang
- Universitas Muhammadiyah Surakarta, Sukoharjo Regency
- Universoitas Muhammadiyah Semarang, Semarang
- Universitas Katolik Soegijapranata, Semarang
- Universitas Muhammadiyah Purwokerto, Banyumas Regency
- Unuversitas Wahid Hasyim, Semarang
- Universitas Negeri Semarang, Semarang
- Universitas Diam Nuswantoro, Semarang
- Universitas Islam Negeri Wali Songo, Semarang
- Universitas Muhammadiyah Magelang, Magelang Regency
- Universitas Kristen Satya Wacana, Salatiga
- Universitas Pancasakti, Tegal

== Special Region of Yogyakarta ==
- Faculty of Medicine Gadjah Mada University, Yogyakarta
- Faculty of Medicine Muhammadiyah University of Yogyakarta, Yogyakarta
- Faculty of Medicine Islamic University of Indonesia, Yogyakarta
- Faculty of Medicine Duta Wacana Christian University, Yogyakarta
- Faculty of Medicine Ahmad Dahlan University, Yogyakarta

== East Java ==
- Faculty of Medicine Hang Tuah University, Surabaya
- Faculty of Medicine Airlangga University, Surabaya
- Faculty of Medicine Wijaya Kusuma University, Surabaya
- Faculty of Medicine Brawijaya University, Malang
- Faculty of Medicine Maulana Malik Ibrahim State Islamic University Malang, Batu
- Faculty of Medicine University of Muhammadiyah Malang, Malang
- Faculty of Medicine Jember University, Jember
- Faculty of Medicine Surabaya University, Surabaya
- Faculty of Medicine Widya Mandala Catholic University, Surabaya
- Faculty of Medicine Ciputra University, Surabaya
- Faculty of Medicine Nahdlatul Ulama University of Surabaya, Surabaya
- Faculty of Medicine Malang Islamic University, Malang
- Faculty of Medicine Muhammadiyah University of Surabaya, Surabaya
- Faculty of Medicine Surabaya State University, Surabaya
- Faculty of Medicine Malang State University, Malang
- Faculty of Medicine Sepuluh Nopember Institute of Technology, Surabaya
- Faculty of Medicine Jawa Timur Pembangunan Nasional Veteran University, Surabaya

== Bali ==
- Faculty of Medicine Udayana University, Denpasar
- Faculty of Medicine and Health Sciences Warmadewa University, Denpasar
- Faculty of Medicine Ganesha University of Education, Buleleng Regency

== West Nusa Tenggara ==
- Faculty of Medicine Mataram University, Mataram
- Faculty of Medicine Al-Azhar Islamic University, Mataram

== Easr Nusa Tenggara ==
- Faculty of Medicine Nusa Cendana University, Kupang

== West Kalimantan ==
- Faculty of Medicine Tanjungpura University, Pontianak

== Central Kalimantan ==
- Faculty of Medicine Palang Karaya University, Palangkaraya

== South Kalimantan ==
- Faculty of Medicine Lambung Mangkurat University, Banjarmasin

== East Kalimantan ==
- Faculty of Medicine Mulawarman University, Samarinda

== North Sulawesi ==
- Faculty of Medicine Sam Ratulangi University, Manado

== Gorontalo ==
- Faculty of Medicine Gorontalo State University, Gorontalo

== Central Sulawesi ==
- Faculty of Medicine Tadulako University, Palu
- Faculty of Medicine Alkhairaat University, Palu

== South Sulawesi ==
- Faculty of Medicine Hasanuddin University, Makassar
- Faculty of Medicine Muslim Indonesia University, Makassar
- Faculty of Medicine Bosowa University, Makassar
- Faculty of Medicine Muhammadiyah University of Makassar, Makassar
- Faculty of Medicine Alauddin Islamic State University, Makassar

== Southeast Sulawesi ==
- Faculty of Medicine Haluoleo University, Kendari

== Maluku ==
- Faculty of Medicine Pattimura University, Ambon

== North Maluku ==
- Faculty of Medicine Khairun University, Ternate

== Southwest Papua ==
- Faculty of Medicine Papua University, Sorong Regency

== Papua ==
- Faculty of Medicine Cendrawasih University, Jayapura

== See also ==
- Medical school
- List of medical schools
