= Triyanto Triwikromo =

Indonesian writer

- Born: Salatiga, Central Jawa, Indonesia
- Occupations: Writer, editor
- Writing career
- Pen name: Triyanto Triwikromo
- Language: Indonesian

Triyanto Triwikromo is an Indonesian writer born in Salatiga, Central Java.

He graduated from Diponegoro University in Semarang with a master's degree in literature. He worked as a lecturer in Creative Writing at his alma mater and as a managing editor at the daily newspaper Suara Merdeka. He has written collections of short stories, Rezim Seks (Regime of Sex), Ragaula, Sayap Anjing (Dog Wings), Anak-anak Mengasah Pisau (Children Sharpening the Knives), Malam Sepasasang Lampion (The Night of a Pair of Paper Lanterns).

He participated in the Utan Kayu International Literary Biennale in East Jakarta in 2005 and 2007 as well as Wordstorm: Northern Territory Festival in Darwin, Australia in 2005. He was a speaker of the Ubud Writers Festival in Ubud, Bali, in 2008. He was one of the authors of a collection of short stories, LA Underlover, in 2008. His collection of poetry Pertempuran Rahasia (Secret Combat) was published in 2010, and his short story collection Surga Sungsang (Wrong Side Up Heaven) was published in 2014. He was chosen as one of the five greatest fiction writers in the Kusala Sastra Khatulistiwa Literary Award 2014. He was the winner of the 2009 Language Center Literary Award for the short story collection, Ular di Mangkuk Nabi (The Snake in the Prophet's Bowl). Ten of his short stories in the Kompas Choice Short Stories Collection from 2003 to 2012 were published in book form as Celeng Satu Celeng Semua (One Wild Pig All Wild Pigs). His short story Cahaya Sunyi Ibu (Mother's Quiet Night) was carried in the 2008 Golden Pen Literary Award for 20 Best Indonesian Short Stories.

From 2012 to 2013, he was involved in implementing the citybooks program that was produced by deBuren, a renowned Belgian cultural organisation. The translation of his long poems about Semarang into Dutch, English and French. And his short stories translated into Swedish and English.

== Publications ==
- Triwikromo, Triyanto (1987). Rezim Sex (short stories) (in Indonesian). Semarang: Semarang : Aini. ISBN 9799675219.
- Triwikromo, Triyanto (2002). Ragaula (short stories) (in Indonesian). Semarang: Semarang : Aini. ISBN 9799675200.
- Triwikromo, Triyanto (2003). Sayap Anjing (short stories) (in Indonesian). Jakarta: Jakarta : Kompas. ISBN 9797090914.
- Triwikromo, Triyanto (2003). Anak-anak Mengasah Pisau (short stories) [Children Sharpening the Knives translated by Ignatia M. Hendrarti, Kristian Tamtomo] (in Indonesian). Semarang: Semarang: Masscom Media. ISBN 9793395060. OCLC 53059265.
- Triwikromo, Triyanto (2004). Malam Sepasasang Lampion (short stories) (in Indonesian). Jakarta: Jakarta : Kompas. ISBN 9797091295.
- Triwikromo, Triyanto (2008). LA Underlover (short stories) (in Indonesian). Yogyakarta: Yogyakarta:Katakita. ISBN 9789793778525. OCLC 317067128.
- Triwikromo, Triyanto (2010). Pertempuran Rahasia (poetry) (in Indonesian). Jakarta: Jakarta:Gramedia Pustaka Utama.
- Triwikromo, Triyanto (2013). Celeng Satu Celeng Semua – 10 cerpen pilihan Kompas, 2003–2012(short stories) (in Indonesian). Jakarta: Jakarta:Gramedia Pustaka Utama. ISBN 9792294422. OCLC 857586139.
- Triwikromo, Triyanto (2014). Surga Sungsang (short stories) (in Indonesian). Jakarta: Jakarta:Gramedia Pustaka Utama. ISBN 9786020303291. OCLC 887188424.
- Triwikromo, Triyanto (2015). A Conspiracy of God-killers translated by George A. Fowler (short stories). Jakarta: Jakarta:Lontar Foundation. ISBN 9786029144437. OCLC 910838339.
