= Service-learning in engineering education =

Many engineering educators see service-learning as the solution to several prevalent problems in engineering education today. In the past, engineering curriculum has fluctuated between emphasizing engineering science to focusing more on practical aspects of engineering. Today, many engineering educators are concerned their students do not receive enough practical knowledge of engineering and its context. Some speculate that adding context to engineering helps motivate engineering students' studies and thus improve retention and diversity in engineering schools. Others feel that the teaching styles do not match the learning styles of engineering students.

Many engineering faculty members believe the educational solution lies in taking a more constructivist approach, where students construct knowledge and connections between nodes of knowledge as opposed to passively absorbing knowledge. Educators see service-learning as a way to both implement a constructivism in engineering education as well as match the teaching styles to the learning styles of typical engineering students. As a result, many engineering schools have begun to integrate service-learning into their curricula.

== History ==
The end of World War II marked the beginning of a movement toward increased emphasis on engineering science in engineering education. Initially, this movement enhanced the quality of engineering education. However, after decades of rising focus on science engineering, undergraduate engineering education began to lack instruction on practical engineering applications. Concurrently, the undergraduate engineering experience became increasingly fragmented. As one author described it, "Schools break knowledge and experience into subjects, relentlessly turning wholes into parts, flowers into petals, history into events, without ever restoring continuity."

In the 1980s, many different organizations, including both research institutions and professional associations, conducted studies in attempts to resolve the educational problems in the engineering field. Though they conducted their research independently, they arrived at several common conclusions. Researchers agreed that the engineering schools should continue to provide solid basic theory knowledge. However, they also called for added emphasis on synthesis and design understanding as well as increased exposure to societal context and interdisciplinary teamwork. Later reports reiterated the need for more exposure to engineering's context as well as a need to make engineering more attractive and relevant to students. Papers also reported the need for engineering students to develop professional and interpersonal skills.

== Engineering education today ==
Today, requirements for engineering programs reflect a movement to resolve the engineering education problems found in past studies. Many engineering educators see service-learning as a way to enhance their programs by exposing students to engineering context while also giving them a chance to develop professional and interpersonal skills. These values are reflected in the Accreditation Board for Engineering and Technology (ABET) standards for engineering schools. For an engineering program to maintain accreditation, ABET requires that they "demonstrate that their students attain the broad education necessary to understand the impact of engineering solutions in a global, economic, environmental, and societal context".

=== Pedagogical implications ===
Constructivism

The service-learning method ties in well with a teaching philosophy known as constructivism. Constructivism is an educational theory rooted in psychology and sociology. It asserts that learners construct knowledge from previous knowledge rather than passively absorbing knowledge from outside sources. Furthermore, learning includes both creation of new factual knowledge and understanding the connections between different nodes of knowledge. Service-learning provides an environment where students can actively construct knowledge while engaging in actual projects. The reflection portion of service-learning gives students time to create connections between old and new knowledge.

While accepted by many, some educators have criticized constructivism both epistemologically and pedagogically. Pedagogically, critics claim that a constructivist approach gives students in-depth knowledge but not breadth of knowledge. Since in a constructivist approach takes a significant amount of time to allow students to create new knowledge and relate it to previous knowledge through reflection, instructors usually cannot cover a large amount of material. However, while this may become a real concern for many courses, the specific role of service-learning plays in engineering school courses mitigates these concerns. Service-learning typically appears in introductory or optional courses in the engineering school. The goals of these courses is not so much to gain a detailed and broad understand of a field, but rather to have a real world engineering experience. This is notably different from courses where students must obtain vast amounts of accurate knowledge for precise calculations.

Critics also worry that a constructivist approach to education leaves the learner too disconnected from reality since it constantly focuses on building new knowledge based on pre-existing knowledge. Thus, theoretically, as they continue building knowledge off of their pre-existing knowledge in isolation, their view of the world could slowly become skewed from reality. While this may be a weakness for many courses, in service-learning, students work to create real solutions for a real customer. Thus their ideas must be resolved, not only with fellow engineering team members, but also with reality.

Learning styles

In past years, studies on engineering education revealed the learning styles of most engineering students and the teaching styles of many engineering professors were incompatible. The five well known learning style dimensions include: sensing/intuitive, visual/auditory, inductive/deductive, active/reflective, and global/sequential.

According to Richard Felder from North Carolina State University and Linda Silverman from the Institute for the study of Advanced Development, most engineering students are visual, sensing, inductive, and active learners. Also, many of the creative students are global learners. However, most engineering education is auditory, intuitive, deductive, passive and sequential.

However, such conclusions are not well-supported by research. There is no evidence that identifying a student's learning style produces better outcomes, and there is significant evidence that the widespread "meshing hypothesis" (that a student will learn best if taught in a method deemed appropriate for the student's learning style) is invalid. Well-designed studies "flatly contradict the popular meshing hypothesis".

Online service learning

Though the interest in service learning at educational institutions has increased, these projects are often very costly to students and universities. However, there have been some examples of successful service learning projects facilitated over the Internet.

=== Engineering programs with service-learning ===
Many different universities have incorporated service-learning into their curricula to address the contextual, motivational, and multi-disciplinary team needs. Purdue University created the Engineering Projects in Community Service (EPICS) program in 1995. Under this program, freshman to senior undergraduate engineering students form multi-disciplinary teams to meet community needs. Students earn a variable number of credit hours based on their year in school and related contribution to the project. At Purdue, the service projects are long-term and students earn up to seven semesters worth of credit working on the service project. The program began with 40 students on 5 teams but has quickly grown to 400 students on 24 teams.

The EPICS program at Purdue as well as service-learning programs at other universities, have succeeded in offering students practical experience, context, and motivation for engineering. Seventy seven percent of the students who were able to come back to the EPICS program stayed for additional semesters. On student evaluations, 70% of students indicated that the program positively impacted their decision to stay in engineering; of the 30% that responded differently, several indicated they had previously decided to stay in the engineering before the program and thus, the program did not affect their decision to stay in engineering. Student responses also returned favorable results for the educational objectives. The table below summarizes the responses:

On evaluation comments, students also expressed that EPICS had completely changed their view of engineering, giving them both meaning and direction in all of their engineering studies.

Penn State University has created a certificate program entitled 'Humanitarian Engineering'. The emphasis of the program is on relationship building – and are not simply project-driven exercises. Long-term, sustainable, collaborative partnerships are formed with host universities and marginalized communities. This enables development of outreach programs at the universities reaching into local communities. The Penn State program is vertically integrated across the four-year engineering program allowing students to form these long-term relationships with the host communities. This method allows for greater understanding of the cultural aspects of engineering design and its impact, as well as development of technical proficiency. There is also a very strong emphasis on entrepreneurship in the program. Engineering design solutions are developed and students are encouraged to develop business plans and implement them in the host community.\

Clemson University also hosts Clemson Engineers for Developing Countries (CEDC), a multi-level immersive student-led organization and class that provides Clemson students of any major with service-learning and project experience. The focus of the program is to provide sustainable solutions aimed at improving the quality of life for those living in the emerging world while using students for all design, planning, and project implementation. CEDC has a student-led corporate organizational structure, including vertical integration from freshmen to graduate students and horizontal integration from over 30 majors, and works on between 15 and 20 projects per semester. The program also features multidisciplinary teams of 2–4 student interns who live in Haiti year- round, fall and spring break trips to Haiti for groups of 10–14 students to collect data for their projects, and a course at Clemson University for students to work on their multi-semester projects. The program has designed and managed over $2 million in construction projects in Haiti, all with direct oversight and management from the CEDC interns who are housed by Partners in Health. To date, CEDC students have implemented projects all over Haiti's rural Central Plateau (including several in Change), which include several water systems, a fish hatchery, a biodigester system, and repairing public schools.

== Social and ethical implications ==
The ACM Code of Ethics lists contributing to society and human well-being as well as improving public understanding of an engineer's practice area. Through service-learning, engineers are provided with the opportunity to both contribute to society and educate the public.

Along with fostering a community-university relationship, educators hope that incorporating service-learning will increase diversity and retention in the engineering school. Diversifying the engineering population will allow engineering teams to maintain a better understanding of the needs in a society. Thus, diversifying engineering teams will allow engineers to both meet real needs as well as provide interfaces to their solutions which the public can understand. Likewise, a society needs a vast population of engineers to meet the needs of a vast society.

== See also ==
- Campus Compact
- Constructivism
- Cooperative education
