= Darmanto Jatman =

Indonesian poet and writer

- Born: Soedarmanto Jatman; 16 August 1942; Jakarta, Indonesia
- Died: 13 January 2018 (aged 75); Semarang
- Resting place: Semarang
- Occupations: Emeritus Professor humanist philosopher poet
- Partner: Sri Muryati
- Children: Abigael Wohing Ati, Omi Intan Naomi, Bunga Jeruk Pekerti, Aryaning Arya Kresna, Gautama Jatining Sesami
- Writing career
- Pen name: Darmanto Jatman
- Language: Indonesian

Darmanto Jatman (16 August 1942 – 13 January 2018.) was an Indonesian poet and writer. He was an Emeritus Professor at the Faculty of Psychology, Diponegoro University (UNDIP), Semarang. He was known as a humanist, philosopher and poet of Indonesia. He gave birth to the establishment of the Faculty of Psychology at UNDIP and became the first professor in the faculty. On 27 July 2007, Susilo Wibowo of UNDIP gave him the title of Professor, exactly a month before he retired, so that he was immediately given the title of Emeritus Professor.

== Biography ==
He completed his basic education in Yogyakarta and graduated from the Faculty of Psychology at Gadjah Mada University (UGM), Yogyakarta (1968). After his S2 (master course) at the Faculty of Psychology, Diponegoro University (UNDIP), Semarang, he became a lecturer in Psychology of Communication from 1 June 1971. He also completed Development Planning at the University College, London (UCL). He taught at ASRI Yogja (Indonesian Institute of the Arts, Yogyakarta), then at the Faculty of Social Science and Political Science, UNDIP. In 1983, co-founded the Faculty of Psychology at Soegijapranata Catholic University, Semarang. He once became the culture editor of ‘’Dinamika Baru, Kampus, Suara Merdeka’’ (activities in Semarang), ‘’Tribun’’ (Jakarta), and up to now lead the campus newspaper UNDIP ‘’Manunggal’’ and magazine FISIP UNDIP ‘’Forum’’. He also once led the Yogya Christian Theatre and the Yogya Christian Literature Study Club. In 1980 he held the Adelaide Festival, Australia. And in 1983 held the International Poetry Festival in Rotterdam, Netherlands.

== Publications ==
- Darmanto, Jatman (1968). Sajak-sajak Putih (collection of poetries) (in Indonesian). Jakarta.
- Darmanto, Jatman (1968). Ungu (collection of poetries) (in Indonesian). Jakarta.
- Darmanto, Jatman (1974). Bangsat! (collection of poetries) (in Indonesian). Jakarta. OCLC 3397404.
- Darmanto, Jatman (1976). Sang Darmanto (collection of poetries) (in Indonesian). Jakarta. OCLC 2705790.
- Darmanto, Jatman (1980). Ki BlakasutaBla Bla (collection of poetries) (in Indonesian). Semarang: Karya Aksara. OCLC 10081176.
- Darmanto, Jatman (1985). Sastra, Psikologi, dan masyarakat (book) (in Indonesian). Bandung: Alumni. OCLC 14158669.
- Darmanto, Jatman (1986). Sekitar masalah Kebudayaan (Essays) (in Indonesian). Bandung: Alumni. OCLC 65121796.
- Darmanto, Jatman (1994). Golf untuk Rakyat (Selections from five previous volumes of poems) (in Indonesian). Yogyakarta: Bentang. OCLC 30992507.
- Darmanto, Jatman (1994). Bunga rampai komunikasi manusia (Book) (in Indonesian). Semarang: Duta Tiwikrama : Jurusan Ilmu Komunikasi FISIP-UNDIP. OCLC 32006606.
- Darmanto, Jatman (1996). Perilaku Kelas Menengah Indonesia (book) (in Indonesian). Jakarta: Yayasan Bentang Budaya. OCLC 36946679.
- Darmanto, Jatman (1997). Psikologi Jawa (book) (in Indonesian). Jakarta: Gramedia Widiasarana Indonesia. OCLC 37947142.
- Darmanto, Jatman (1997). Isteri (poems) (in Indonesian). Yogyakarta: Yayasan Bentang Budaya. OCLC 38485773.
