= Dr. Kariadi Hospital =

Dr. Kariadi Central General Hospital
- Ministry of Health
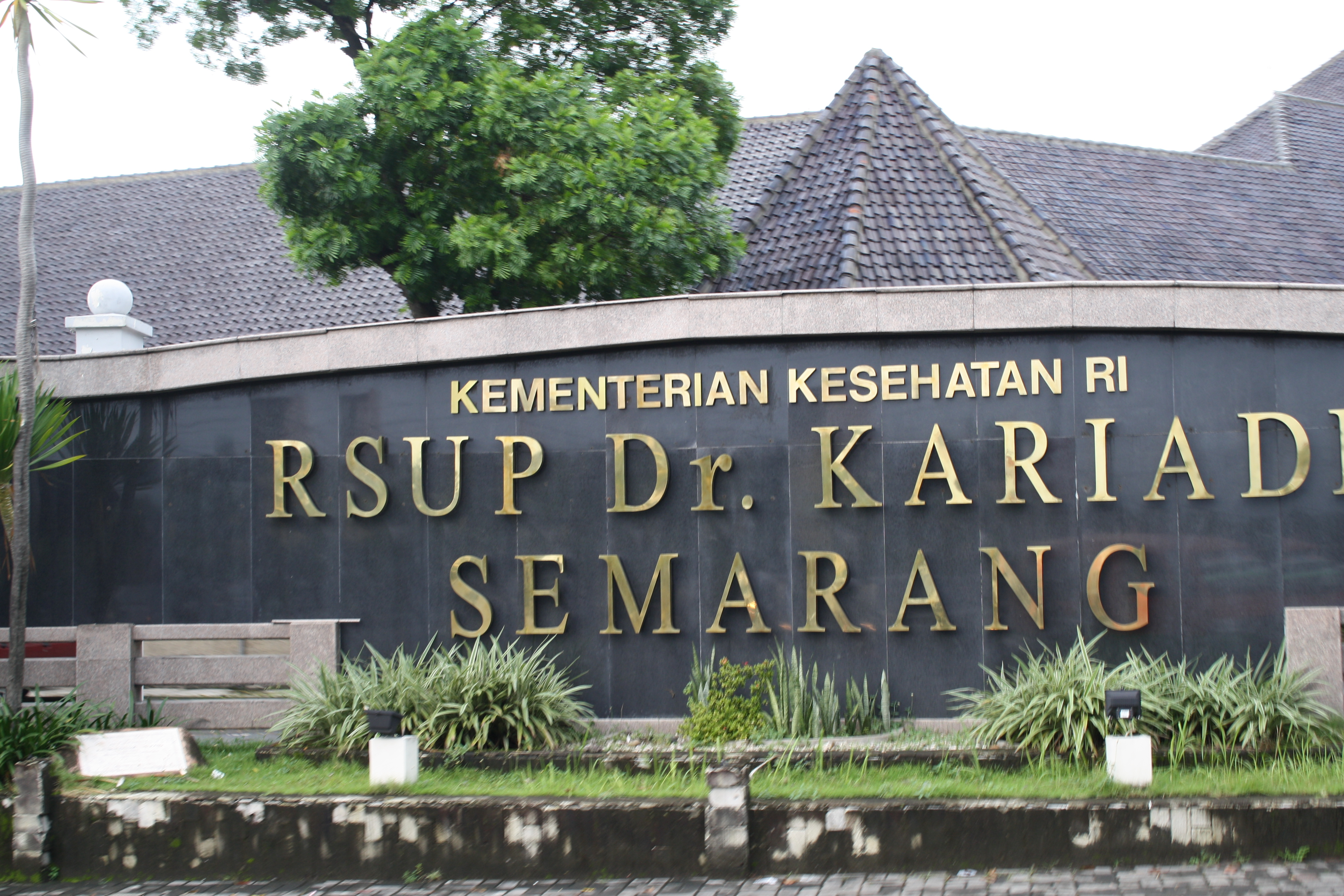

Geography
- Location: Jalan Dr. Sutomo 16, Randusari, South Semarang, Semarang, Central Java, Indonesia
- Coordinates: 6°59′40.524″S 110°24′27.9″E

Organisation
- Care system: Public
- Type: Teaching, District General
- Affiliated university: Diponegoro University

Services
- Standards: A Type Hospital - Indonesia
- Emergency department: Yes

History
- Former name: Centrale Burgerlijke Ziekeninrichting
- Founded: September 9, 1925; 101 years ago

Links
- Website: www.rskariadi.co.id
- Lists: Hospitals in Indonesia

The Dr. Kariadi Central General Hospital (Indonesian: Rumah Sakit Umum Pusat Dr. Kariadi) or RSUP. Dr. Kariadi, is a district general hospital affiliated with the Faculty of Medicine Diponegoro University. It is one of the leading hospitals of Indonesia, sited in Semarang, Central Java. The director is Hendriani Selina, M.D.

Dr. Kariadi Hospital is a Technical Implementation Unit of the Department of Health. The Hospital is supervised by the General Director of Medical Services, Ministry of Health Republic of Indonesia.

== History ==
The hospital's history began in 1925.

=== 1925 – 1942 (Netherlands East Indies) ===
In 1919, N.F. Liem, M.D. proposed to replace and incorporate the City Hospital ("Stadverband Ziekenhuis") in Tawang with Assistant City Hospital ("Hulp Stadverband Ziekenhuis") in Alun - alun Semarang. The plan was realized by building a larger hospital in Semarang. Construction began in 1920 and was completed five years later. On 9 September 1925 the Central Civil Hospital (Dutch: Centrale Burgerlijke Ziekeninrichting, CBZ) opened.

=== 1942 – 1945 (Japanese Occupation) ===
During the Japanese occupation, Dutch physicians were taken as prisoners. Hence, the hospital selected Dr. Notokuworo act as director to fill in the leadership. He was soon replaced by Dr. Buntaran Martoatmodjo until 1945. Thereafter, the hospital was led by the Indonesian people. Japanese government renamed it into Central People's Hospital (Indonesian: Pusat Rumah Sakit Rakyat, PURUSARA, Japanese: 中央市民病院, romanized: Chūō Shimin Byōin).

=== 1945 – 1950 (Revolution) ===
In 1945 a civilian in Indonesia Contact Dr. Kariadi that a Japan Soldier Poisoned the water of Semarang,Kariadi went to check but was killed by a Japan Soldier

=== 1950 – now (Independence) ===
After independence, the hospital was renamed General Hospital Center Semarang, and in 14 April 1964 it was renamed Dr. Kariadi Hospital (Minister of Health No. SK.. 21215/Kab/1964).

== Special units ==
The hospital serves multiple specialties:

- Neurosurgery and Epilepsy Center
- Pavilion of Garuda (Clinical Specialists and Subspecialists Center)
- Dr. Kariadi Cardiovascular Center
- Pavilion of Professor Dr. R. Budhi Darmojo (Geriatrics Center)
- Clinic of Reproductive Endocrinology and Infertility
- Physical Medicine and Rehabilitation Center
- Center of Developmental Disorder and Autism
- Center of tropical infectious diseases
- Iodine Deficiency Disturbances Laboratory
- Regional Avian Influenza and Molecular Microbiology Laboratory

== Facilities ==
- Radiology and Medical Imaging
- Clinical Diagnostic Center.
- Laboratory of Diagnosis
- Pharmacy
