= Faculty of Medicine, Diponegoro University =

Medical School in Indonesia

Faculty of Medicine Diponegoro University
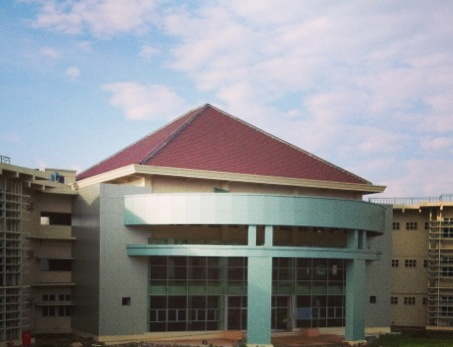
- Campus of Faculty of Medicine Diponegoro University
- Type: Public
- Established: October 1, 1961; 65 years ago
- Dean: Tri Nur Kristina, Prof. M.D.
- Location: Tembalang, Semarang, Indonesia; 7.049°S 110.438°E
- Campus: Rural
- Colors: Green
- Website: www.fk.undip.ac.id
- Location in Semarang

Faculty of Medicine, Diponegoro University (Indonesian: Fakultas Kedokteran Universitas Diponegoro) is one of the leading medical schools in Indonesia. Established on October 1, 1961, the medical school is officially affiliated to Dr. Kariadi Hospital the General Center Hospital in Central Java. In 2011, the medical school celebrated its 50 years of anniversary in giving contribution to the three basic goals of higher education which are medical education, research, and community services. Refer to the THES-QS Top World University Rankings in 2007, for the category of Life Science and Biomedicine, the medical school is ranked on 410th.

== History ==
Since the Japanese occupancy in Semarang, there had been established a medical school, to provide the medical doctors. The medical school then sank with the ending of Japanese reign era.

In 1955 Djojo-bojo Foundation (with members team Boentaran M.D., and Atmadi Wreksoatmodjo M.D.) had an aspiration about establishing a new medical school at Semarang. But this effort was not really successful because of lack coordination between Head of Health Inspection with the Director of Hospital and Head of Department Health Semarang due to the political parties and status at that time. Even though there was a Hospital Medical Center in Semarang, which was quite representative to be a teaching hospital of a medical school.

In 1958, Heyder bin Heyder, M.D., and Soerarjo Darsono, M.D., met the Diponegoro University President, Mr. Soedarto, SH and delivered the idea of establishing a medical school, as Universitas Gadjah Mada medical students did their internship at Semarang General Hospital.

Universitas Diponegoro Foundation was established in 1959, with Faculty of Law, Faculty of Economics and Business, Faculty of Teaching and Education, also Faculty of Engineering. This fact led to the new idea of establishing a medical school.

During the Universitas Diponegoro Foundation meeting joint with the Universitas Diponegoro Senates on June 10, 1960, upon R. Atmadi Wreksoatmodjo M.D.’s idea, decided to establish a medical school of Universitas Diponegoro.

Establishment of a medical school committee was formed. The chair-person was Suyono Atmo, and secretary is Sri Widojati Notoprodjo, SH. Technical Committee was also formed, headed by Colonel R. Soehardi, M.D., secretary Heyder bin Heyder, M.D., and members R. Kolonel, M.D., A. Soerojo, M.D., R. Marsaid S. Sastrodihardjo, M.D., Tjiam Tjwan Hok, M.D., and R. Soedjati, M.D.

Since 1951, Semarang General Hospital Center was an affiliate teaching hospital for the internship of Universitas Gadjah Mada Medical School, especially Department of Child Health, Department of Obstetrics and Gynecology, also Department of Otolaryngology Head And Neck Surgery. Although the medical students examination was done in Yogyakarta, but at least the Semarang General Hospital was experienced in teaching medical students, especially in clinical internship.

Technical committee on March 9, 1961 had a plenum, and the decisions are:

Hospital director is appointed as the ex official Dean of Medicine, and begins to do the preparation, while Heyder bin Heyder, M.D., as the vice Dean of Medicine, and also secretary. Committee decides the Semarang General Hospital Medical Center is quite representative to be a teaching hospital. Committee approves the medical education curriculum of 6 years education proposed by Atmadi Wreksoatmodjo, M.D. Reckoning in the preclinical level education still needs time, the decision is still to open the higher level medical education. Information related to several senior medical students from Universitas Gadjah Mada Medical School who are ready to do exchange to Semarang On March 29, 1961, Heyder bin Heyder, M.D., and Soerarjo Darsono, M.D. met Prof. Soedjono Djoened Poesponegoro, Dean of Medicine, Universitas Indonesia Medical School, looking for suggestions and advice and assistance as the preparation to establish a medical school in Semarang. Prof. Soedjono recognized and understood the committee and local people's aspiration, agreed that would give assistance (lecturers) from Universitas Indonesia Medical School, and realized in 1963.

There was a chairman change at Semarang General Hospital from Atmadi Wreksoatmodjo, M.D., to Soepaat Soemosoedirdjo, M.D., then on July 1, 1961, released the Universitas Diponegoro Presidential Decree No.782 C, about Soepaat Soemosoedihardjo, M.D. inauguration as the Dean of Medicine and Heyder bin Heyder, M.D., as the vice Dean of Medicine. Because Soepaat Soemosoedirdjo, M.D., who had just arrived from Klaten and had not recognized the procedural, Heyder bin Heyder, M.D. was assigned to carry out all activities.

The preparations done by R. Soerarjo Darsono, M.D., and Heyder bin Heyder, M.D., had negotiation with chairpersons of Universitas Gadjah Mada Medical School Yogyakarta and higher medical students of UGM. On July 12, 1961, one delegation consists of Soedarto SH (President of Universitas Diponegoro Semarang), Heyder bin Heyder, M.D. (medical school secretary) and Soepaat Soemosoedirdjo (Hospital Director) met Minister of Education Prof. Iwa Koesoemasoemantri who agreed about the establishment of a medical school.

Minister of Health, Prof. Satrio, M.D., agreed and suggested to give the Dean of Medicine position to an army due to Central Java condition at that time. Both Minister of Education and Minister of Health did not agree that the Dean of Medicine was also the Hospital Director. Then on July 12, 1961 at Jakarta, Colonel Soewondo, M.D., medical doctor of DKT KODAM VII as the Dean of Medicine and Heyder bin Heyder, M.D., head of Department Surgery as the vice of Dean.

Related to the previous agreements, on August 24, 1961 was held the last meeting, directed by Heyder bin Heyder, M.D., and attended by all heads of departments in Semarang General Hospital, Tendean M.D., from psychiatric hospital, and Go Gien Hoo, M.D. from Saint Elizabeth Hospital. They gave ideas and suggestions, also aspiration.

On August 31, 1961, held another meeting at Yogyakarta. Committee delegates were Soedarto, SH, Heyder bin Heyder, M.D., Sardjono Dhanoedibroto, M.D., Atmadi Wreksoatmodjo, M.D., and Soedjati Soemodiharjo, M.D.. From Universitas Gadjah Mada Medical School, Prof. Drs.Med Radiopoetro. And the decisions were:

The number of doctoral degree medical students from UGM those will be switched maximal 40 students. The switching has to be based on voluntary. Those students will be granted as medical students of Universitas Diponegoro and granted graduation certificate from Universitas Diponegoro. The medical school was officially inaugurated by Vice Minister of Higher Education and Science on the first Dies Natalis. Medical education begins from the higher level (internship) of 6 Doctorandus Medicine from UGM in 1961, and became 30 people in 1962. On October 1, 1962, educated the new medical students from the basic level.

== Departments ==
- Department of Anatomy
- Department of Anesthesiology
- Department of Biochemistry
- Department of Child Health
- Department of Clinical Pathology
- Department of Dermatology
- Department of Forensic Medicine
- Department of Medical Biology
- Department of Medical Chemistry
- Department of Medical Pharmacy
- Department of Medical Physics
- Department of Medicine
- Department of Microbiology
- Department of Neurology
- Department of Neurosurgery
- Department of Nutrition Science
- Department of Obstetrics and Gynaecology
- Department of Ophthalmology
- Department of Otorhinolaryngology - Head and Neck Surgery
- Department of Parasitology
- Department of Pathology
- Department of Pharmacology
- Department of Physical Medicine and Rehabilitation
- Department of Physiology
- Department of Public Health and Preventive Medicine
- Department of Psychiatrics
- Department of Radiology
- Department of Surgery
- Medical Education Development Unit
- Center of Epidemiology and Biostatistics Unit
- Ethics Commission for Health Research FMDU-Dr.Kariadi General Hospital

== Programs ==
The faculty now offers five undergraduate programs, ten postgraduate programs, and five doctorate programs.

Undergraduate Programs

- Medical Doctor
- Dentistry
- Pharmacy
- Nutritional
- Nursing

Apart from regular programs, the faculty also offers numerous resident specialty programs, sub-specialty programs, and fellowship programs.

Medical Specialty Programs

- Anesthesiology
- Cardiology and Vascular Medicine
- Clinical Microbiology
- Clinical Nutrition
- Clinical Pathology
- Dermatology and Venereology
- Forensic Medicine
- General Internal Medicine
- Neurology
- Neurosurgery (new)
- Obstetrics and Gynecology
- Ophthalmology
- Otorhinolaryngology - Head and Neck Surgery
- Pathology
- Pediatrics
- Physical Medicine and Rehabilitation
- Psychiatry
- Radiology
- Surgery

Sub-Specialty Programs

- Maternal-Fetal Medicine
- Reproductive Endocrinology and Infertility
- Internal Medicine Cardiovascular
- Surgical Oncology
- Surgical Urology

== Teaching Hospital ==
=== Main Teaching Hospital ===
- Dr. Kariadi Hospital

=== Comprehensive Teaching Hospital ===
- Dr. Soesilo Hospital Tegal
- Sunan Kalijaga Hospital Demak
- RA. Kartini Hospital Jepara
- Blora Hospital Blora
- Rembang Hospital Rembang
- Rehatta Hospital Jepara
- Donorojo Leprosy Center Jepara

=== Network Teaching Hospital ===
- Batang Hospital Batang
- Kraton Hospital Pekalongan
- Tidar Hospital Magelang
- Tugurejo Hospital Semarang
- Ketileng Hospital Semarang
- Ungaran Hospital Ungaran
- Prof.Dr. Margono Soekarjo Hospital Purwokerto
- Dr. Amino Gondohutomo Psychiatric Hospital Semarang

== Centers of Research and Excellence ==
- Medical Education Unit (MEDU Diponegoro)
- Center of Epidemiology and Biostatistics Unit (CEBU Diponegoro)
- Lab. Gangguan Akibat Kekurangan Yodium (GAKY)
- Center of Avian Influenza, Molecular and Clinical Microbiology
- Center for Tropical and Infectious Diseases (CENTRID)
- Center for Biomedical Research (CEBIOR)

== See also ==
- List of medical schools in Indonesia
