= Methodist University of Indonesia =

Private university in Indonesia

- Universitas Methodist Indonesia
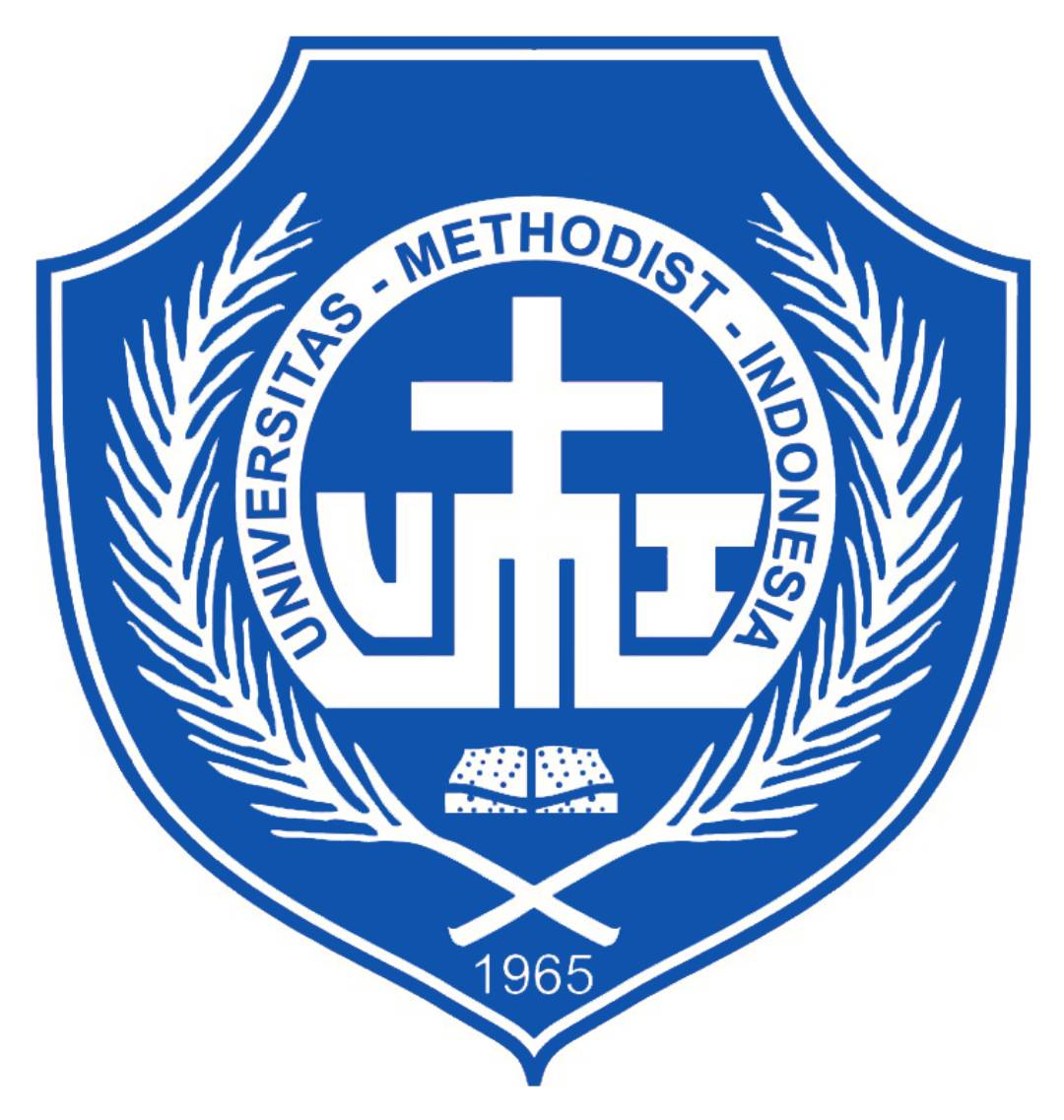
- Seal of the Methodist University of Indonesia
- Motto: Esse-Est In Intellectu
- Type: Private
- Established: 1965
- Affiliations: Methodism
- Rector: Drs. Humuntal Rumapea, M.Kom
- Academic staff: 307
- Students: 1,358
- Location: Medan, North Sumatera, Indonesia
- Campus: Urban
- Nickname: UMI Medan
- Website: https://www.methodist.ac.id

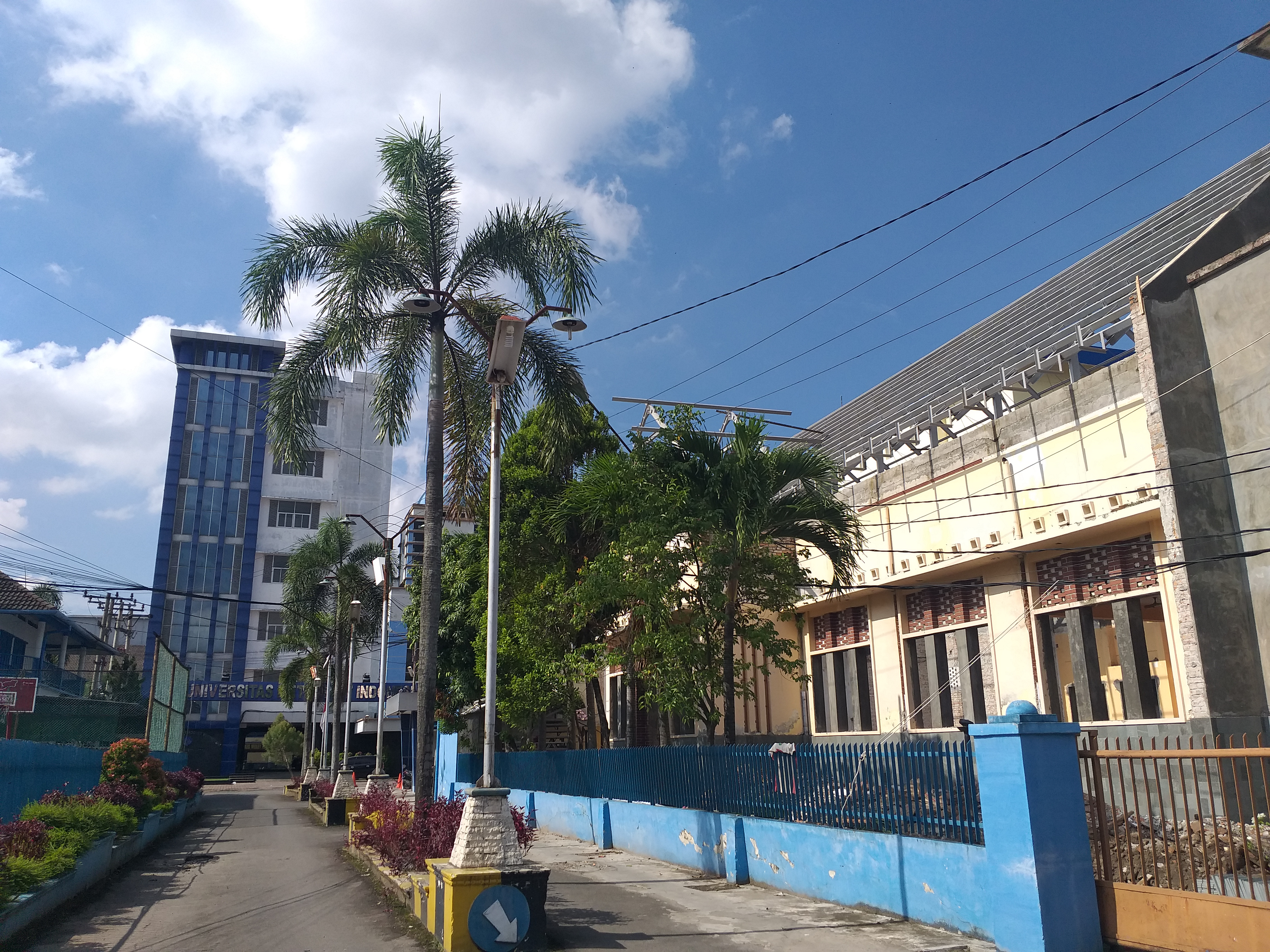
Campus I of UMI in Medan

The Methodist University of Indonesia (Indonesian: Universitas Methodist Indonesia) abbreviated as UMI, is a private university in Medan, North Sumatera, Indonesia. The university belongs to Methodist Church in Indonesia.

It offers undergraduate programs in the following disciplines:

- Accountancy
- Agricultural Economic Sociology
- Agronomy
- English Literature
- Management
- Medicine

== History ==
Universitas Methodist Indonesia (UMI) Medan was named Perguruan Tinggi Methodist Indonesia (PTMI). It was a private university founded by the Methodist Church of Indonesia (GMI) in accordance with the decision of the annual conference which took place in Medan on 31 January 1965. Preparation of UMI officially began on August 1, 1965. PTMI changed its name to UMI on Date 4 September 1969 in accordance with Law No. 22 of 1961 on Higher Education.

The administering agency of UMI is a Methodist church Education Foundation Indonesia Region I that was founded on March 22, 1988, based on Notarial Deed No. 48; it has been amended several times. The last time changes were based on Deed No. 12 on 24 September 2008 tailored to the Law of the Republic of Indonesia Number 16 in 2001 on the foundation in conjunction with Law of the Republic of Indonesia Number 28 of 2004 concerning Amendment to Law Number 16 About the Foundation in 2001. YP GMI Region I registered in the Ministry of Justice and Human Rights with Register Menkumham AHU-AH.01.08-681.

== See also ==
- List of universities in Indonesia
