= Diponegoro University =

Public university in Semarang, Indonesia

- Universitas Diponegoro
- Former name: Universitas Semarang
- Motto: Wiyata Hangreksa Gapuraning Nagara (Sanskrit)
- Motto in English: Safeguarding the Dignity of the Nation
- Type: Public university
- Established: 9 January 1957 (as Universitas Semarang); 1960 (as Universitas Diponegoro)
- Affiliations: ASAIHL, AUAP, ASEA-UNINET, ABEST21, SEAMEO
- Rector: Suharnomo
- Faculty: 1,761 (AY 2019)
- Administrative staff: 1,065
- Students: 55,743 (AY 2019)
- Undergraduates: 40,249 (AY 2019)
- Postgraduates: 4,527 (AY 2019)
- Doctoral students: 1,146 (AY 2019)
- Location: Tembalang, Semarang, Central Java, Indonesia; 7.049°S 110.438°E
- Campus: Rural: Tembalang Campus Urban: Pleburan Campus Total 201 ha (500 acres)
- Colors: Blue
- Mascot: Prince Diponegoro
- Website: www.undip.ac.id
- Location of the university in Semarang

Diponegoro University (Javanese: ꦈꦤꦶꦥ꦳ꦼꦂꦱꦶꦠꦱ꧀ꦢꦶꦥꦤꦼꦒꦫ; Indonesian: Universitas Diponegoro, abbreviated as UNDIP) is a public university located in Semarang, Central Java, Indonesia. It was founded in 1957 as a private university by the Semarang University Foundation, which in 1960 became a public university named after Javanese Prince Diponegoro. It is the oldest education corporation in Central Java.

== History ==
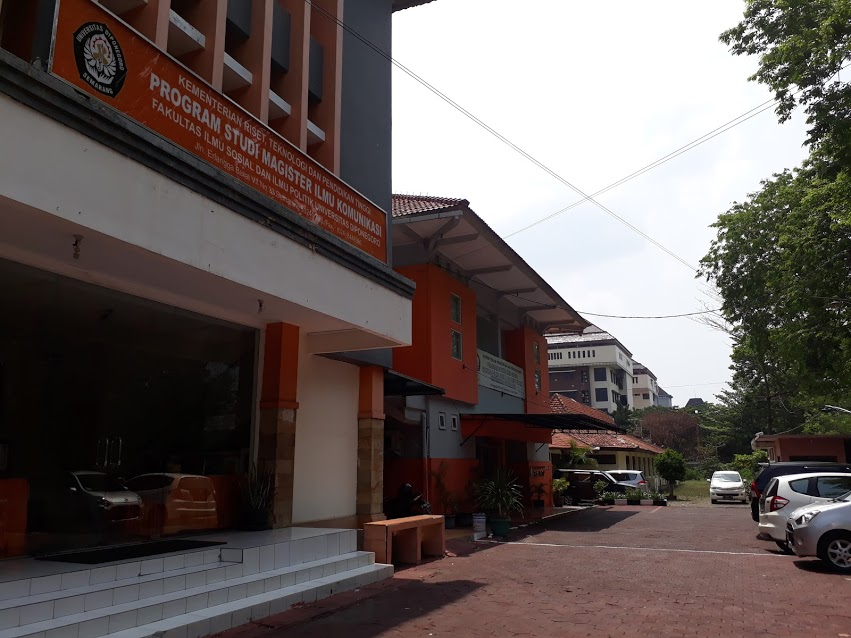
Postgraduate Faculty of Social and Political Sciences in Pleburan Campus.

In the early 1950s, people in Central Java, especially in Semarang, needed a university to provide higher education learning and teaching facilities. Its purpose was to assist the government in managing and overseeing all areas of development, especially in the field of education. At that time, only Gajah Mada University existed as a public university to provide higher education for people in Yogyakarta and also Central Java.

As the number of senior high school graduates had been continuously been increasing without increment in the number of universities, some graduates could not have gained a seat in higher education in north of Central Java. Considering this situation, MR. Imam Bardjo and his colleagues formed an educational foundation, namely Yayasan Universitas Semarang (Foundation of Semarang University), noted by notary R.M. Soeprapto on Notarial Deed No 59, 4 December 1956. The foundation was the first step to establish a university in Semarang, namely Semarang University, which was officially opened on 9 January 1957, and Mr. Imam Bardjo was the first President (Rector) of the university.

When Semarang University celebrated its third Dies Natalis (anniversary) on 9 January 1960, President of Indonesia, Sukarno renamed the Semarang University as Diponegoro University. Changing the name of Semarang University was intended as a tribute to the university's performance in development of higher education in Central Java. The President's decision was confirmed by the Government Regulation No. 7 1961 and Decree Minister of Education, Teaching and Culture No. 101247 / UU on 3 December 1960.

The decision was retroactive to 15 October 1957, and this date is commemorated as the day of Diponegoro University's Dies Natalis as well as for remembering "Five Days Battle in Semarang", which is part of Indonesian National Revolution war that took place in Semarang City. Diponegoro University chose the date as its Dies Natalis for continuing national heroes' vision and mission for Indonesia's independence, by developing the nation's next generation.

The year of 1957 was defined as the year of Diponegoro University's establishment by considering history of Semarang University as a private university founded in 1957 was an embryo of Diponegoro University. The date of establishment 15 October 1957 was stated in Rector's report on the 13th Dies Natalis of Diponegoro University.

Currently under the Government Regulations No. 81/2014 and Government Regulations of the Republic of Indonesia No. 52/2015, Diponegoro University earns the status of PTN-BH (Perguruan Tinggi Negeri-Badan Hukum/State-Owned Higher Education with a Legal Entity Status).

== Academics ==
=== Faculties ===
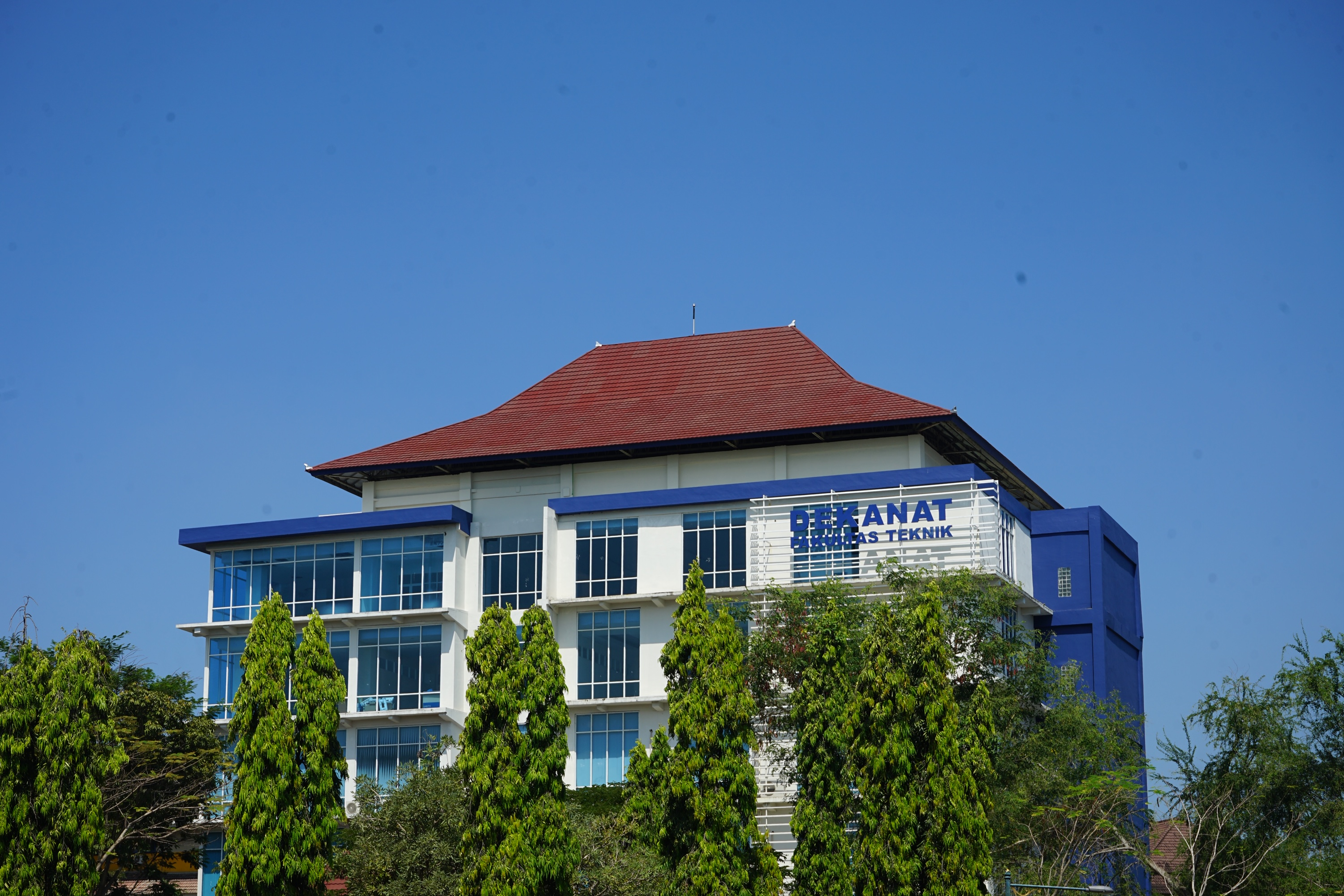
Faculty of Engineering

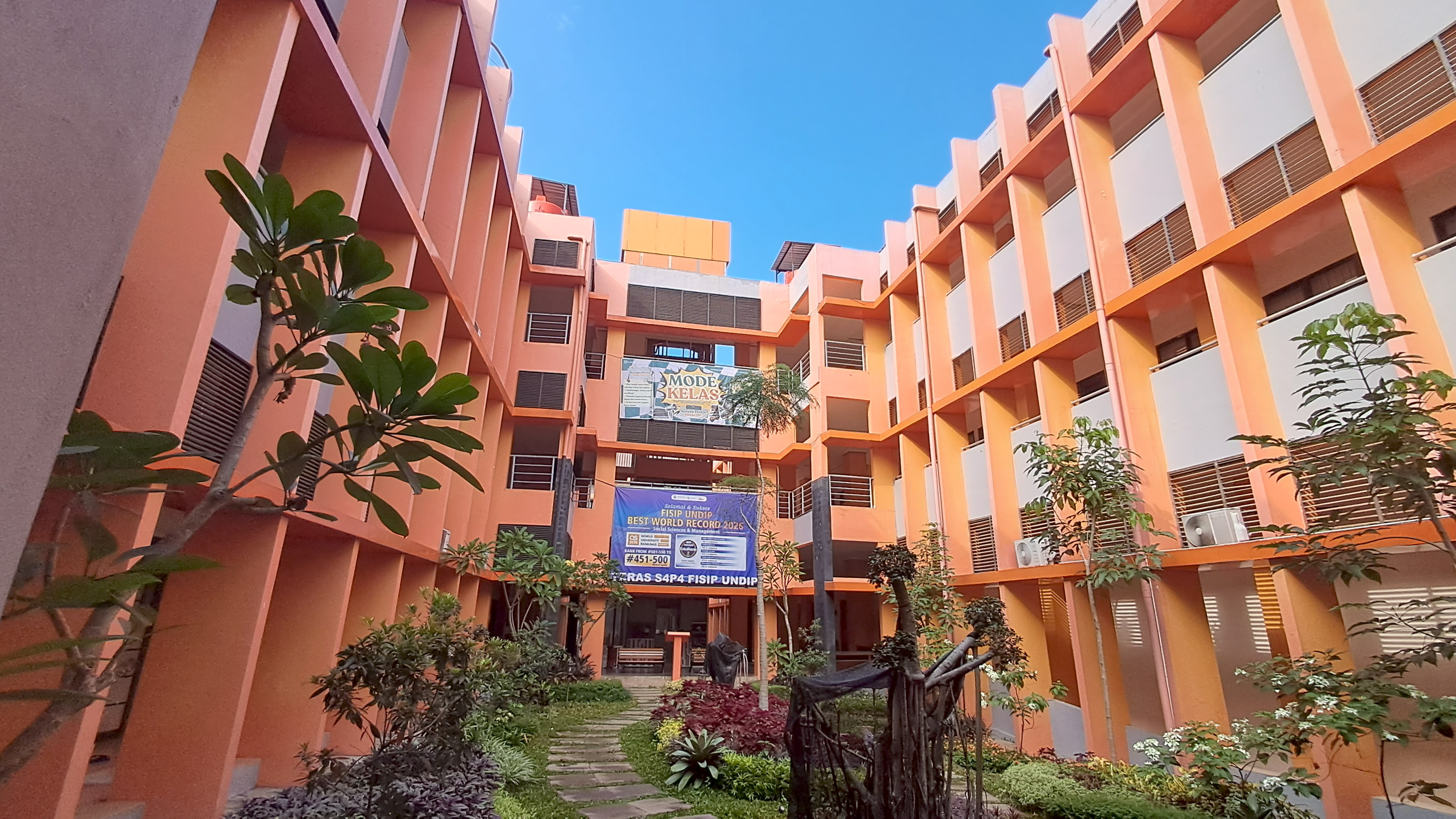
Faculty of Social and Political Sciences

Undip has 11 official faculties and 2 schools.

- Faculty of Animal and Agricultural Sciences
- Faculty of Economics and Business
- Faculty of Engineering
- Faculty of Fisheries and Marine Sciences
- Faculty of Humanities
- Faculty of Law
- Faculty of Medicine
- Faculty of Psychology
- Faculty of Public Health
- Faculty of Sciences and Mathematics
- Faculty of Social and Political Sciences
- Postgraduate School
- Vocational School

=== Admissions ===
==== Postgraduate ====
Diponegoro University offers the number of Postgraduate Programs for all prospective students in Indonesia and international students from around the world. There are 34 Postgraduate Study Programs, consist of 8 doctorate and 28 master programs offered. These programs are opened widely for the university graduates achieving higher degree of education. The university gives a very high consideration and priority to the quality of the postgraduate program. Development of education, research and community service are based on the university's scientific pattern, that is coastal eco-development. Program is delivered in accordance to the program nature and domain, with customized assessments at program and subject level.

==== International students ====
International applicants for admission to UNDIP's undergraduate program are required to complete or are completing high school. The medium of instruction for international classes at UNDIP is English. As of 2020, there are about 230 international students in Diponegoro University.

== Rankings ==
University rankings

Global – Overall
- QS World: =624 (2026)
- QS Employability: 251–300 (2023)
- THE World: 1201+ (2022)

Regional – Overall
- QS Asia: =134 (2025)
- THE Asia: 501+ (2022)

In the QS World University Rankings 2025, the Diponegoro University ranked in the range of 721–730 globally and ranked eighth in Indonesia. Meanwhile, in the QS Asian University Rankings 2021, the Diponegoro University ranked 241st in Asia and ranked ninth in Indonesia. Diponegoro University also ranked in the range of 301–500 globally by QS Graduate Employability Ranking.

In the Times Higher Education World University Rankings 2021, Diponegoro University is ranked in the range of 1001+ globally. Undip also ranked in the range of 101–200th globally in Impact Rankings 2020, where Undip ranked 49th globally in Impact Rankings: Responsible Consumption and Production 2020. In THE WUR 2021 also ranked Diponegoro University as number 4 in Indonesia. In June 2021, in the QS World University Rankings 2022, Diponegoro University is ranked in the range of 1001+ globally and ranked eighth in Indonesia.

Diponegoro University's ranking and accreditation are follows:

- BAN-PT: Diponegoro University obtained accreditation "A" in BAN-PT (13/SK/BAN-PT/Akred/PT/II/2018)
- uniRank.org: Undip rank third best campuses in Indonesia. While the positions 1 through 2 respectively occupied by the Gadjah Mada University (UGM) and University of Indonesia (UI).
- QS: Diponegoro University ranked 8 in Indonesia in the QS World University Ranking and ranked 9 in Indonesia in the QS Asian University Ranking
- THE: Diponegoro University is in the fourth position out of 9 universities in Indonesia that THE WUR has recognized, as a respected position at the international level.
- World Greenmetrics: Diponegoro University ranking is 39 with score of 8,025 (ranked 2 in Indonesia)
- Scopus: Undip scientific publications indexed in Scopus totalled 7,790 documents and ranking seventh in Indonesia.

=== Subject ===
QS World University Rankings by Subject 2025

World rank	Subject
151 – 200	Petroleum Engineering
201 – 250	
251 – 300	▲ Law
301 – 350	
351 – 400	
401 – 450	Engineering Chemical; ▼ Agriculture & Forestry
451 – 500	
501 – 550	Economics & Econometrics
551 – 600	▼ Business & Management Studies
601 – 650	
651 – 700	
701 – 750	Medicine

QS by Clusters (2026)
Subject	Global	National
Arts & Humanities	501-550	7
Engineering and Technology	501-550	6
Life Sciences & Medicine	-	-
Natural Sciences	-	-
Social Sciences & Management	▲451-500	8

THE World University Rankings by Subject 2026
Subject	Global	National
Arts & humanities	-	-
Business & economics	▲801-1000	7
Computer science	-	▲ -
Education	-	-
Engineering	1251+	11
Law	▲301-350	▲3
Life sciences	1001+	6
Medical & Health	1001+	▼10
Physical sciences	1001-1250	▲3
Psychology	-	-
Social sciences	801-1000	▲6

== Research organisations ==
There are numerous research centres and service centres in Diponegoro University under LPPM (Lembaga Penelitian dan Pengabdian Masyarakat/Institute for Research and Community Service) of Diponegoro University:

- Centre for Gender Studies
- Health Research Centre
- Centre for Development Studies
- Centre for Service Training Programme
- Community Service Programme (KKN) Service Centre
- Public Service Programme Centre
- Centre for Promotion and Publication of Research Results and Intellectual Property Rights services (HKI)
- Centre for Disaster Studies
- Centre for Development Policy and Management Studies
- Natural Medicine Research Centre
- Centre for Energy Policy Studies (Pusaka Energia)
- Centre for Biomass and Renewable Energy Studies
- Anti-Corruption Research Centre
- Centre for Marine Studies
- Diponegoro Disaster Response Team (D-DART Undip)
- Centre for Sport and Youth Studies
- Asia Studies Centre
- Centre of ASEAN Study
- Centre of Trade & WTO Policy
- Centre of International Human Rights & Humanitarian Law Studies
- Centre for Bio Mechanics, Bio Material, Bio Mechatronics, and Bio Signal Processing (CBIOM3S)
- Centre for Coastal Rehabilitation and Disaster Mitigation Studies (CoREM)
- Environmental Research Centre (PPLH)
- Halal Study Centre
- Laboratory for Disorders Due to Iodine Deficiency (GAKY)
- Leprosy Study Centre
- Medical Education Unit (MEDU Diponegoro)
- Centre of Epidemiology and Biostatistics Unit (CEBU Diponegoro)
- Centre of Avian Influenza, Molecular and Clinical Microbiology
- Centre of Tropical Infectious Diseases (CENTRID)
- Centre of Biomedical Research (CEBIOR)
- Centre of Nutrition Research (CENURE)
- Centre for Geothermal Research (Pusat Penelitian Geothermal)
- Centre of Marine Ecology and Biomonitoring for Sustainable Aquaculture (Ce-MEBSA)
- Centre for Plasma Research (CPR)
- Family Empowerment Centre (PPK)
- Aging Research Centre (ARC)
- Centre for Experiment and Psychometric Studies (CEPS)

== Campuses ==
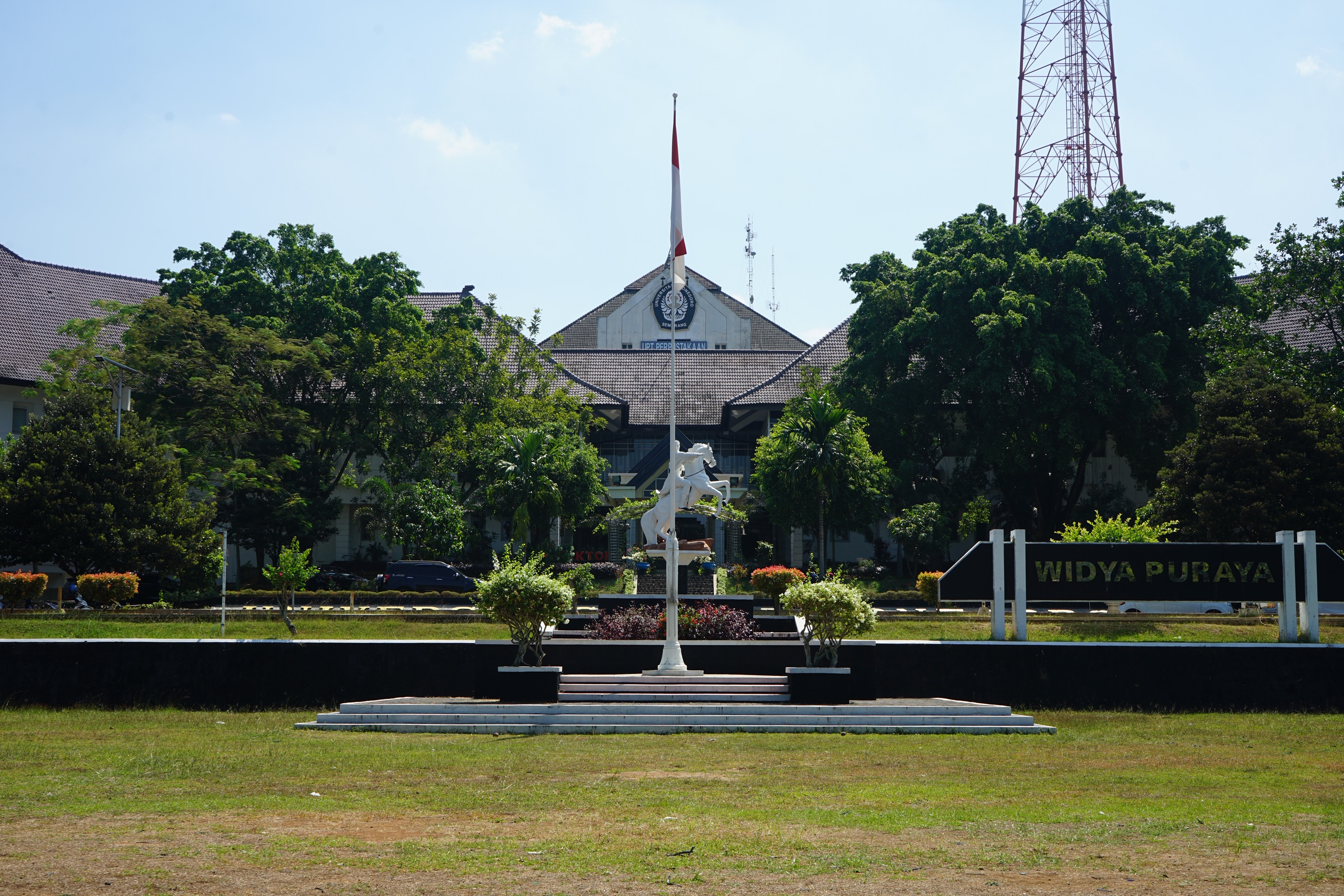
Widya Puraya rectorate and statue of Diponegoro in Tembalang Campus.

Undip is in Semarang – the capital city of Central Java. The university has 8 campuses outside Semarang as far away as Jepara, about 70 km northeast Semarang.

=== Main campus ===
- Tembalang Campus is the largest and the newest. Tembalang occupies about 213 hectares with an administrative center, Central library, rectorate of Widya Puraya, all of the 11 faculties and 2 schools.
- Pleburan Campus is the oldest campus since the existing campuses were merged in its early establishment. The campus occupies about 8 hectares area, with the Magister and Doctorate Program and some operational units.

=== Other campus ===
- Gunung Brintik Campus and Dr. Soetomo Campus has the Faculty of Medicine. It is near Dr. Kariadi Hospital.
- Teluk Awur Campus (60 hectares) is in Jepara, 70 km northeast Semarang. (Faculty of Fisheries and Marine Science).
- Mlonggo Campus, Jepara. (Faculty of Medicine)
- Kalisari Campus, Semarang. (Laboratory of Faculty of Engineering)
- Ade Irma Suryani Campus, Jepara. (Laboratory for Faculty of Fisheries and Marine Science).
- Kagok Housing, Semarang.

== Facilities ==
=== Dormitory ===
Rumah Susun Sewa bagi Mahasiswa (Rusunawa) is the student dormitory building. The building has five twin blocks:

- Building A has 84 rooms with 252 students.
- Building B, C, and D, each have 96 rooms with 288 students with three persons per room.
- Building E has 114 rooms. It is the newest dormitory building, construction finished in 2018.

=== Central library ===
Diponegoro University Library (Perpustakaan Universitas Diponegoro) is centred in Widya Puraya Central Library in the Tembalang campus and comprises over 400 individual libraries and over 4,000 volumes. Faculties have department libraries and literature from journal alumni.

=== Mosque ===
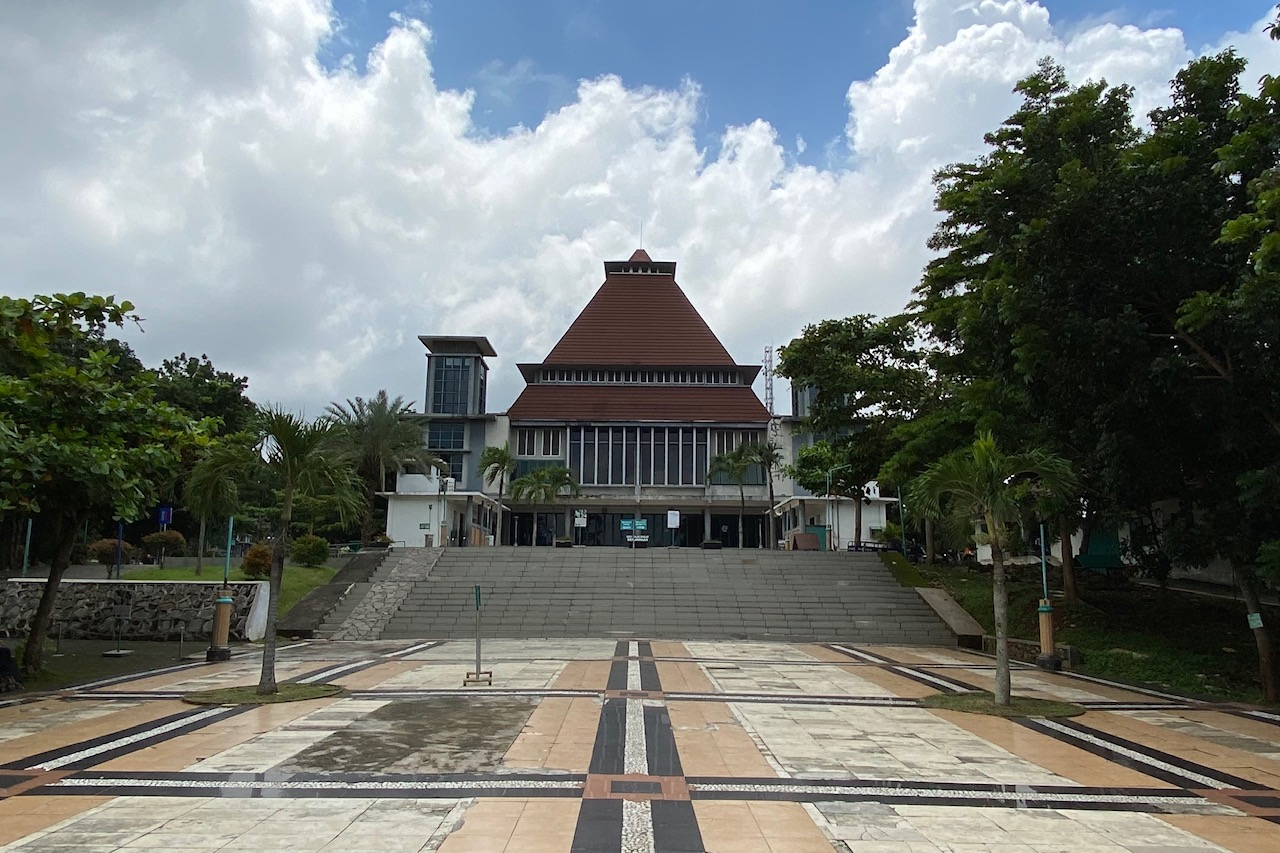
Diponegoro University Mosque

Maskam (Masjid Kampus Undip) or Undip Campus Mosque is a mosque at the Tembalang campus. It's surrounded by a natural environment and nearby central campus' area. The architecture is from 'pyramid' building and became one of the most unusual mosques in Semarang. Construction began in 2004 and finished in 2009.

=== Student centre ===
Diponegoro University Student Centre (SC) is the central building for Undip students' activities. The student centre was built to fulfil the needs for a place where students can express their creativity and increase their achievement, and home bases for numerous UKM (Unit Kegiatan Mahasiswa/Student Activities Unit). It has several rooms: one pavilion, 40 rooms for UKM, one prayer room, one canteen, and two transit rooms.

=== Sport ===
- Diponegoro University Stadium
  - Football field
  - Athletic track
  - Calisthenics corner
- International Indoor Stadium Undip
- Badminton & tennis court
- Basketball court

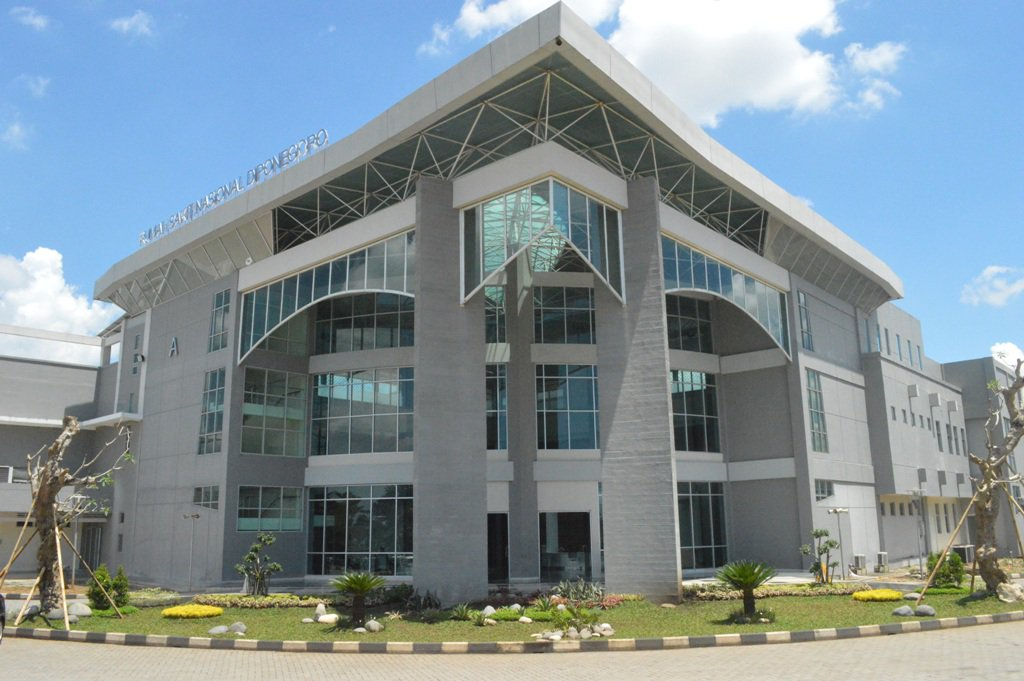
Diponegoro National Hospital (Rumah Sakit Nasional Diponegoro/RSND) in Undip campus

== Notable staff and alumni ==
Undip has produced over 200,000 graduates. Many of them become a public figure, politician, entrepreneur, writer, artist, and many more. Some of the selected examples are below:

- Anindya Kusuma Putri, Puteri Indonesia 2015, Top 15 Miss Universe 2015, spokesperson for the Indonesian Minister of Youth & Sports Affairs.
- Arief Hidayat, fifth Chief Justice of the Constitutional Court of Indonesia.
- Baharuddin Lopa, Indonesian Minister of Justice and Human Rights and later Attorney General of Indonesia.
- Bondan Winarno, Indonesian culinary expert and writer.
- Darmanto Jatman (Professor Emeritus of Psychology Faculty of Diponegoro University, humanist, philosopher and poet Indonesia).
- Hendarman Supandji (Attorney General of the Republic of Indonesia 2007–2010).
- Ko Kwat Tiong, lawyer, members of the Volksraad, politician and Indonesian nationalist.
- Michael Bambang Hartono (owner of PT Djarum).
- Mohamad Nasir, Minister of Research, Technology, and Higher Education of the Republic of Indonesia (in Working Cabinet, 2014–2019).
- Muladi (Minister of Justice in the Seventh Development Cabinet and Development Reform Cabinet of Indonesia in 2005–2011).
- Robert Budi Hartono (owner of PT Djarum).
- Sanitiar Burhanuddin, present Attorney General of Indonesia, serving since October 2019 in the cabinet of President Joko Widodo.
- Soekarwo (Governor of East Java 2009–2014).
- Taufik Kurniawan, Deputy Speaker of People's Representative Council of the Republic of Indonesia (DPR RI) in 2014–2019.
- Tjahjo Kumolo, Indonesian Minister of Administrative and Bureaucratic Reform. Previously served as Minister of Home Affairs in 2014–2019.
- Triyanto Triwikromo, Indonesian writer.
